Riyaz Kharrat (born in Karbala) is an eminent Iranian scientist in the field of chemical engineering and petroleum engineering. He is a full professor at Montanuniversität Leoben.

His research interests and activities are about enhanced oil recovery (EOR), improved oil recovery (IOR), asphaltene & wax studies, thermal recovery methods, and reservoir modeling and simulation.

Riyaz Kharrat was born on 8 December 1956 in Karbala. He graduated from Hakim Sanai High School of Esfahan, Iran in 1975. He then went to the United States to continue his studies.
He obtained his BSc degree in chemical engineering from Kansas University in the United States in 1981, then continued his education with a master's degree and doctorate in chemical engineering, majoring in enhanced oil recovery.  During his staying at Kansas University, he was teaching math courses and was working in the Tertiary Oil Recovery Project (TORP). For his excellence in mathematics teaching, he was awarded the Florence Black Award for Excellence in Teaching, Dept. of Mathematics, University of Kansas, US, 1987-1988.

Kharrat has published more than 170 ISI International publications in well-known international journals, 48 SPE papers, 27 national journals and had participated in more than 165 national and international seminar and symposia and had supervised more than 130 MSc. and PhD. thesis in the field of chemical and petroleum engineering.

Education
 University of Kansas, U.S. – Ph.D. in chemical eng. (enhanced oil recovery), 1989
 University of Kansas, U.S. – M.S. in chemical eng. (thermal recovery), 1984
 University of Kansas, U.S. – M.S. in mathematics, 1984
 University of Kansas, U.S. – B.S. in chemical eng., 1981

Present position
 Professor of Montanuniversität Leoben – Department of Petroleum Engineering (2018–present)

Industrial experience
 Kish Petroleum Engineering (2012- 2017)
 Salman Full Field Study and MDP preparation- Project Manager
 Kish development operation- Project Manager
 Azar Oil Full Field Study and In-house Special Services- Project Manager
 Petroiran Development Company (2006- 2011)
 Azadeghan oil development – Reservoir Engineering& Simulation consultant
 Oil Layer of South Pars Field – Reservoir Engineering& Simulation consultant
 Petran Research Company, Senior Reservoir Engineer (2000-2006)
 Foroozan oil field development - Reservoir Engineering
 Kuh E Mond heavy oil development study – Reservoir Engineering

Previous positions
 Professor of Petroleum University of Technology (1990-2017)
 Dean of Tehran Petroleum Faculty (2014-2017)
 Dean Adjunct of Innovation and monitoring of PUT center (2011- 2014)
 Director of PUT Research Center-Tehran (2004-2010)
 SPE Middle East region Vice Chairperson (2008-2011)
 SPE Chairperson of Iran Section 2002-2009.
 Dean of Research at Petroleum University of Technology, 2000-2004
 Dean of Graduate Studies of Petroleum University of Technology, 2000-2004.
 Dean of Ahwaz Faculty of Petroleum Engineering, PUT, 1995-1999. 
 Chairman of Chemical and Petroleum Eng. Dept., Ahwaz, PUT, 1992-1994. 
 Visiting Professor at Tehran University, 1994-1995.
 Dean of Abadan Faculty of Chemical and Petrochemical Engineering, PUT, 1992-1993.
 Teaching Assistance, Department of Mathematics, University of Kansas, 1987-1990.
 Research Assistance, Tertiary Oil Recovery Project, Lawrence KS, U.S., 1984-1987.
 Teaching Assistance, Department of CPE, Kansas University, 1983-1986.

International teaching experience
 EOR in Fractured Carbonated Reservoirs- Montanuniversität Leoben Austria 2016-2017
 Advanced Mathematics in Petroleum Engineering - IFP France& PUT joint program, 2005-2008.
 Advanced Mathematics in Petroleum Engineering - Curtin University Australia and PUT joint program, 2005-2008.
 Advanced Enhanced Oil Recovery - Calgary University and PUT joint program, 2005-2008.
 Advanced Petroleum Fluid Properties- Calgary University, Canada and PUT joint program, 2005-2008.
 Petroleum Laboratory I & II- Department of CPE, Kansas University-USA 1983-1986.
 Calculus I & II- Department of Mathematics, University of Kansas –USA 1986-1989.

Activities
 Improved Oil Recovery (IOR), Enhanced Oil Recovery (EOR), Reservoir Modeling and Simulation, and Wax and Asphaltene studies,

Grants
 Experimental study of Asphaltene of Sarvak reservoir-Azadeghan Field, PEDEC, principal investigator, 2011–2014
 Investigation of Asphaltene precipitation in Dorood oil field and suggestion some solution methods, principal investigator, 2009–2011
 Feasibility study of EOR method for Naftshar field, NIOC Central, principal investigator, 2009–2010
 Experimental Study of Miscible Solvent Injection Process in Azadeghan, Yadavaran and Koh-e-Mond Heavy Oils and Investigation of Effective Parameters on Oil Recovery Efficiency Using Glass Micro model, principal investigator, 2008–2009
 Experimental and theoretical study of Asphaltene study of Azadeghan Field, PEDEC, principal investigator, 2007–2008
 Experimental and theoretical study of the Vapex process for Iranian heavy oil reservoir, PEDEC, principal investigator, 2007–2008
 Reservoir Evaluation Diagnosis and Remedies of Sirri-A Field, ONIOC R&D, principal investigator, 2003–2004
 Cold and Thermal recovery methods for Iranian Heavy Oil Reservoirs, NIOC R&D, principal investigator, 2003–2005
 Lost Circulation in Maroon field, NIOCS R&D, principal investigator, 2002–2005
 The study of mud additive (Malas, polymer, salt, etc.) on the physical and Rheological properties of Drilling Mud, Grant Award, University of Petroleum Industry, principal investigator, 1998–2000
 Computer Simulation of the Ammonia Cooling System of Razi Petrochemical Plant, principal investigator, 1999–2000
 Evaluation of Chemical Additives in the Razi Petrochemical Cooling System, principal investigator, 1999–2000
 Fouling Computation of Bandar Imam Super Critical Heat Exchangers, principal investigator, 1999–2000
 Technical and Economical Evaluation of using Bandar Imam excess H2 for the Ammonia plant of Razi Petrochemical Company, principal investigator, 2001–2002

Award and honors
 National Distinguished Researcher Award, 2014
 Petroleum Ministry Distinguished Researcher Award, 2014
 Khuzestan Providence Scientific Research Distinguished Award, 2013
 Petroleum University of Technology Distinguished researcher award, 2013
 25th Khwarizmi International Award, 2012
 WAITRO Innovation Award, 2012
 Petroleum University of Technology Distinguished researcher award, 2012
 Regional SPE Honors Award, 2011
 National Distinguished Book Referee Award,  2011
 National Distinguished researcher Award, 2010.
 Petroleum Ministry Distinguished Researcher Award, 2010.
 Khuzestan Technical University Research Award, 2010
 Petroleum University of Technology Distinguished Researcher Award, 2010.
 Petroleum University of Technology Distinguished Researcher Award, 2009.
 Petroleum University of Technology Distinguished Researcher Award, 2008.
 SPE regional (Middle East) service award, 2009
 Technical Book of the year author in chemical engineering, 2007.
 PUT Research distinguish award of the year, 2004-2005
 Student Award for Excellence in Administration, Petroleum University of Technology, 1997-1998
 Student Petroleum Engineering Award for Excellence in Teaching, University of Petroleum Industry, 1996-1997.
 Florence Black Award for Excellence in Teaching, Dept. of Mathematics, University of Kansas, US, 1987-1988.
 Summer Fellowship, University of Kansas, USA, Academic Excellence, 1987-1988.

Professional
 Director in charge of Petroleum Business Review (2017 – present)
 Editor in Chief of Journal of Iranian Gas and Petroleum Engineering (2013 – present)
 Editor J. of Gas Technology, JGT (2015–present)
 Editor Scientia Iranica Journal (2008–present)
 Editor Iranian Chemical and Petroleum Engineering (2008-2013)
 Acting Secretary of SPE Iran section (2010–present)
 Secretary of SPE Iran section (2001-2010)
 SPE MEOS  Committees member (2005-2013)
 IPTC-SPE 2008 Committees member.
 Member of Society of Petroleum Engineering.
 Member of Iranian Chemistry and Chemical Society.
 Member of Iranian Chemical Engineering Institute.
 Member of Iranian Petroleum Institute.
 Member of Petroleum Committee, Higher Education Ministry of IRI, (1998-2005)
 Secretary of the First Petroleum and Petrochemical Corrosion Symposium, Haves, 1993.
 Secretary of the Third National Chemical Engineering Congress, 1998.
 Secretary of the First Reservoir Simulation Seminar, Ahwaz, 1999.

Revised papers for the following journals and meetings
 Journal of Iranian Gas and Petroleum Engineering
 Iranian Journal of Science and Technology
 Chemistry and Chemical Engineering Journal
 First National Iranian Chemical Engineering Congress, 1996.
 Second National Iranian Chemical Engineering Congress, 1997.
 Third National Iranian Chemical Engineering Congress, 1998.
 Fourth National Iranian Chemical Engineering Congress, 1999.
 Fifth National and 4th International Iranian Chemical Engineering Congress, 2000.
 Sixth National Iranian Chemical Engineering Congress, 2001.
 Seventh National Iranian Chemical Engineering Congress, 2003.
 Eighth National Iranian Chemical Engineering Congress, 2005.
 Ninth National Iranian Chemical Engineering Congress, 2006.
 Tenth National and 5th International Chemical Engineering Congress, 2007.
 Programme Committee member of MEOS-SPE 2007.
 Eleventh National Iranian Chemical Engineering Congress, 2008.
 IPTC-SPE 2008.
 MEOS-SPE 2005-2011
 Journal of Petroleum Science and Technology

Books
 Practical Improved Hydrocarbon Recovery- An Industrial Guide Book for EOR and IOR, Published by Lambert Academic Publishing, 2017.
 Reservoir insitu stress and Geomechanic, publication by Setayesh Publication Institute, 2015.
 Asphaltene and Wax in Oil Field: Remedy and Solution, published by Setayesh Press, 2012.
 Material and Energy balances in Chemical engineering, Published by Kerman University, 2009.
 Enhanced oil recovery, Published by Nehr Danish Institute, 2008.
 Description of Problem Solution of Applied Mathematic in Chemical Engineering, Vol. II, Published by Amir Kabir University, 2008.
 Applied Mathematics in Chemical Engineering – Numerical Solution, Vol. II, Published by Mir Kabir University, 2002.
 Mathematical Modeling in Chemical and Petroleum Engineering, Published by Amir Kabir University, 2002.
 Applied Mathematics in Chemical Engineering- Mathematical Formulation and Analytical Methods, Vol. I, Published by Amir Kabir University, 2001.
 Description of Problem Solution of Applied Mathematic in Chemical Engineering, Vol. I, Published by Amir Kabir University, 2001.

Patents
 Construction of VAPEX Apparatus for Enhanced oil recovery application, 2007.
 Micromodel pattern design- Five spot pattern, 2008
 Micro model design using Laser approach for the fluid flow through porous media, 2009.  
 Asphaltene Inhibitor manufacturing for oil reservoir, 2011
 Wax Inhibitor Agent for Oil Reservoir, 2011
 Polymer solution based on Nano Silca for enhanced oil recovery, 2012 
 Sludge Removal agent for oil reservoir, 2012.
 Asphaltene Inhibitor for oil reservoirs process, 2013. 
 Artificial sandstone and carbonate cores, 2015
 Synthetic fractured porous media, 2015

Technical workshops presented
 Heavy Oil from Exploration to Refinery, NIOC, Tehran, August 2005.
 Recent Development in Enhanced Oil Recovery, NIOC, Tehran, June 2006.
 Challenges of production form mature fields, PAU, France, 2008.
 Enhanced Oil Recovery, NIOC, Tehran, October, 2012

Technical professional
 MDP of Salman gas reservoirs, KPE, Tehran, 2015
 MDP of Salman Oil reservoirs, KPE, Tehran, 2015
 MDP of Azar field, KPE, Tehran, 2014
 Basic reservoir engineering study of Salman filed, project manager, 2013
 MDT Analysis of SPOL field, senior reservoir engineering, Tehran 2008.
 Temperature Analysis of SPOL field, senior reservoir engineering, Tehran 2008.
 Azadeghan Rock Typing, senior reservoir engineering, Tehran 2006-2007.
 Azadeghan PVT Analysis, senior reservoir engineering, Tehran 2007.
 Foroozan full field study, senior reservoir engineering, Tehran 2003-2005.
 -*Kuh-e-Mond appraisal study and development, Tehran, 2004.
 Feasibility Study of In-situ combustion process for Kansan oil reservoirs, Tertiary Oil Recovery Project, Lawrence KS, U.S.A., 1984-1987.

Technical papers
More the 250 Technical papers have been presented and or published or submitted for publication see attached list of publications:

ISI international journals 
1.	Kharrat R. and Vossoughi S.: Feasibility Study of the In-Situ Combustion Process Using TGA/DSC Techniques, J. Pet. Tech., Vol. 37, No. 9, August 1985, pp. 1141–1445, Trans. Soc. Pet Eng., Vol. 279.
2.	Kharrat, R. and Vossoughi S.: Rheological Behavior of the Gel Systems Used in Enhanced Oil Recovery, Theoretical and Applied Rheology, Vol. 1, Edited by P. Moldenaers and R. Kenning, Elsevier Science Publishers, 1992, p. 478-480.
3.	Kharrat R. Vossoughi S.: Numerical Simulation of Viscoelastic Fluid Flow Past a Cylinder, J. Scientica Iranica, International Journal of Science and Technology, Vol. 1, No. 3, 1994, pp. 205–218.
4.	Kharrat, R., Hamid, J. and Vossoughi S.: Development of a Fully Implicit Two Dimensional in-Situ Combustion Simulation Model, Transport Phenomena in Thermal-Fluids Engineering, Vol. 1, 1996, pp. 238–243.
5.	Salarieh, M., Kharrat, R. and Vossoughi S.: Heavy Oil Deposits in Southern Region of Iran and Steam Assisted Gravity Drainage as a Recovery Technique, Transport Phenomena in Thermal-Fluids Engineering, Vol. 2, 1996, pp. 1134–1139.
6.	Ghazanfari M. H., Rachtchian  D., Kharrat R., S. Vossoughi, Capillary Pressure Estimation Using Statistical Pore Size Functions, Chem. Eng. Technology., 2007, 30, No. 7, 862-869.
8.	Azin R., Kharrat R., Vossoughi S., S. Ghotbi, Rostami B., Investigation of the VAPEX Performance in High Pressure Oil Reservoirs, NSMSI, Vol. 26, No. 3, 2007.

9.	Azin R., Kharrat R., Ghotbi C., Vossoughi S., Effect of Fracture Spacing in VAPEX Performance in Heavy Oil Fractured System, Iran. J. Chem. & Chem. Eng. Vol. 27, No. 1, Spring 2008.
10.	Azin R., Kharrat R., Rostami B., Vossoughi S., Theoretical Investigation of the VAPEX Process in Fractured Heavy Oil System at Reservoir Conditions,  Journal of Petroleum Science and Engineering, 2008, 60(1), pp 51–66.
11.	Kharrat R., S.M. Razavi," Determination of Reservoir Model from Well Test Data, Using an Artificial Neural Network, Scienta Iranica, Vol 15, No. 4, pp 487–493., 2008.
12.	Etminan S R, Maini  B. B., Kharrat R., The Role of Connate Water Saturation in VAPEX Process, Journal of Canadian Petroleum Technology, Vol. 47, No. 2, pp8–12, 2008.
13.	Razzaghi S., Kharrat R., Rashtchian D., Vossoughi S., Saraji S., Investigation of Auto Ignition Condition Under Different Parameters, Iran. J. Chem. & Chem. Eng. 2008.
14.	Behrouz T. Kharrat R. and M.H. Ghazanfari, Experimental study of miscible injection process to crude oil using glass micro model, Iran. J. Chem. & Chem. Eng., 2008.
15.	Razzaghi S., Kharrat R., Vossoughi S., Rashtchian D., In-situ Combustion Validation of Simulation Model by Using Experimental Data, J. Japan Petroleum Inst., 2008.
16.	Ghazanfari, M.H., Rashtchian, D., Kharrat, R. and S. Vossoughi, Transport Property Estimation of Non-Uniform Porous Media, Iran. J. Chem. & Chem. Eng., 2008.
17.	Azin R., Kharrat R., Vossoughi S., Ghotbi C., Study of  The VAPEX Process in  Fractured Physical Systems Using Different Solvent Mixtures, Oil and Gas Science and Technology, 2008.
18.	Etminan S R, Maini  B. B., Kharrat R., The Role of Connate Water Saturation in VAPEX Process, Journal of Canadian Petroleum Technology, Vol. 47, No. 2, pp8–12, 2008.
19.	Fatemi S.M. and Kharrat R., ″Feasibility Study of Top-Down In-Situ Combustion in Fractured Carbonate Systems″, Brazilian Journal of Petroleum and Gas, Vol. 2, Issue 3, pp. 96–105, 2008.
20.	Fatemi S.M. and Kharrat R., ″3D Simulation Study on the Performance of Toe-to-Heel Air Injection (THAI) Process in Fractured Carbonate Systems″, Brazilian Journal of Petroleum and Gas, Vol. 2, Issue 4, pp. 180–190, 2008. 
21.	Jahanshahi E., Salahshoor K., Kharrat R., Online LQG stabilization of unstable gas-lifted oil wells, Computer Aided Chemical Engineering, Vol. 25, pp. 381–386. 2008.

22.	Yadali Jamaloei, B., Kharrat, R.: Fundamental Study of Pore Morphology Effect in Low Tension Polymer Flooding or Polymer-Assisted Dilute Surfactant Flooding, Transport in Porous Media, 76, pp. 199–218, 2009.
23.	Ghazanfari, M., Rashtchian, D., Kharrat, R., Vossoughi, sh.: Transport property estimation of non uniform porous media, published in J. chemistry &  chemical engineering, Vol. 28, No. 2, 2009.
24.	Fatemi S.M., Ghotbi C., Kharrat R., a, ″Effect of Wells Arrangement on the performance of Toe-To-Heel Air Injection″, Brazilian Journal of Petroleum and Gas, Vol.3., Issue 1, pp. 011–028, 2009.
26.	Yadali Jamaloei, B., Kharrat, R.: Analysis of Microscopic Displacement Mechanisms of Dilute Surfactant Flooding in Oil-wet and Water-wet Porous Media, Transport in Porous Media, 81:1–19, April 2009. 
27.	Fatemi S.M., Kharrat R., Vossoughi S., d, ″Simulation of the SAGD Process in a Laboratory-Scale Fractured Model″, World Heavy Oil Congress, Paper 2009-303, Venezuela, 2009.
28.	Fatemi, S.M., Kharrat, R.: Operational and reservoir parameters influencing the efficiency of stem-assisted gravity drainage (SAGD) process in fractured reservoirs, published in Brazilian journal of petroleum and gas, vol. 3, No. 4. P. 125-137, ISSN 1982-0593, 2009.
29.	Alizadeh, A., Nakhli, H., Kharrat, R., Ghazanfari, M., Aghajani, M.: Experimental Study of Asphaltene Precipitation Behavior during Miscible Carbon Dioxide Injection, J. Energy Sources, Part A, in print,  2009.
30.	Mahdavi S., Kharrat R.: Thermodynamic Modeling of Asphaltene Precipitation in South Iranian Oil Reservoir, published in J. Technical & Professional of exploration & Production, 60 (2009).
31.	Nakhli, H., Alizadeh, A., Afshari, S., Kharrat, R., Ghazanfari, M.: Experimental and Modelling Investigations of Asphaltene Precipitation during Pressure Depletion and Gas Injection Operations, J. Petroleum Science and Technology, in print 2009.
32.	Eftekharifar, M., Ali Riahi, M., Kharrat, R.: Investigation of Gustafson-Kessel Algorithm and Kohonen's Self-Organizing Maps for unsupervised Clustering of Seismic Attributes, J. Seismic exploration 18, 315-328 (2009).  
33.	Nasirahmadi, E., Kharrat, R., Ghazanfari, M., Rashtchian, D.: Experimental Investigation of Constant and Concentration-Dependent Diffusivity of Hydrocarbon Solvents-Heavy Oil System: A Comparative Study, accepted for publication in journal of: Energy Sources, Part A: Recovery, Utilization, and Environmental Effects, 2009.
34.	Dennis, P., Razzaghi, S., Kharrat, R., Rashtchian, D. and Vossoughi, S., Studies of Iranian Heavy Oils Pertinent to Reservoir Conditions For Auto-Ignition to Initiate Fire Flooding. Journal of Chemical Engineering Communications, 2009.
35.	Ghazanfari, M.H., Kharrat, R., Rashtchian, and Vossoughi S." Details Model of Dispersion in Porous Media". SPEJ, in print, 2009.
36.	Rostami, B., Kharrat, R., Ghotbi, C., Alipour Tabrizy, V." Relationship between Wetting Properties and Macro scale Hydrodynamics during Forced Gravity Drainage and Secondary Waterflood”. Journal of petroleum Science and Technology, 28: 8, 804 - 815, 2009, April 2010.
37.	Farzaneh S.A., Kharrat R., Ghazanfari M.H., Experimental Study of Solvent Flooding to Heavy Oil in Fractured, 5-Spot Micro models: The Role of Fracture Geometrical Characteristics, Journal of Canadian Petroleum Technology, Vol. 49, No. 3, March 2010.
38.	Yadali Jamaloei, B., Kharrat, R.: Analysis of Pore-level Phenomena of Dilute Surfactant Flooding in Presence and Absence of Connate Water Saturation, Journal of Porous Media, 2010, Volume 13, Issue 8,pp. 671–690.
39.	Tavakkoli M., Kharrat R., Masihi M. and Ghazanfari M. G., Prediction of Asphaltene Precipitation during Pressure Depletion and CO2 Injection for Heavy Crude. Journal of Petroleum Science and Technology, 28: 9, 892 - 902, April 2010.
40.	Mashayekhizadeh, V., Kharrat, R., Ghazanfari, M.: Pore-level Investigation of Free Fall Gravity Drainage in Fractured Porous Media: The Role of Aperture Size and Tilt Angle, J. Transport in Porous Media, 87:561–584, January 2011, 2010. 
41.	Bagheri, M.B, Kharrat, R., Hemattfar T .V, Ghotbi, C: Experimental investigation and genetic algorithm assisted optimization of asphaltene deposition process through porous media, Journal of oil & gas European Magazine, 8, 2010. 
42.	Bagheri, M.B, Kharrat, R., Ghotbi, C.: Experimental investigation of asphaltene deposition process during different production schemes, Oil & Gas Science and Technology-Revue de l'IFP, Vol. 66 (2010), No. 3, pp. 507–519.
43.	Bagheri, M.B, Kharrat, R., Ghotbi, C.: Developing a new scaling equation for modeling of asphaltene precipitation, Journal of Canadian Petroleum Technology (JCPT), awaiting final decision, 2010.
44.	Bagheri, M.B, Kharrat, R. ., Ghotbi, C: Simulation study of permeability impairment due to asphaltene deposition in one of the Iranian oil fractured reservoirs, Journal of Canadian Petroleum Technology (JCPT), Accepted for publication, 2010.
45.	Yadali Jamaloei, B., Asghari, K., Kharrat, R., Ahmadloo, R.: Pore-scale two-phase filtration in imbibition process through porous media at high- and low-interfacial tension flow conditions, Accepted for publication in Journal of petroleum science and technology, 2010. 
46.	Pourabdollah K., A. Zarringharam A., Kharrat R. ,Mokhtari B., Experimental feasibility study of in-situ nano-particles enhanced oil recovery and heavy oil production, Energy Sources, part A: Recovery, Utilization, and Environmental Effects, Accepted in October 2010.
47.	Yadali Jamaloei, B., Kharrat R., Asghari K. Pore-scale events in drainage process through porous media at high- and low-interfacial tension flow conditions, Journal of petroleum science and Engineering Vol 75, 2010, pp223–233.
48.	Rostami B.; Kharrat R.; Pooladi-Darvish M.; Ghotbi C., the Dependency of Relative Permeability on Dominated Flow Regimes under Gas Gravity Assisted Flow, Energy Sources, Part A: Recovery, Utilization, and Environmental Effects 33: 2, 101 — 113, October 2010.
49.	Maghzi A., Mohebbi A., Kharrat R., Ghazanfari M.H.: Pore-Scale Monitoring of Wettability Alteration by Silica Nanoparticles during Polymer Flooding to Heavy Oil in a Five-Spot Glass Micromodel, journal of Transp Porous Med, 87:653–664, December 2010.
50.	Yadali J.B., Kharrat, R., Asghari K., Ahmadloo F.: Pore-scale two-phase filtration in imbibition process through porous media at high- and low-interfacial tension flow conditions, Journal of Petroleum Science and Engineering, Volume 72, Issues 3-4, June 2010, Pages 251-269.
51.	Ghazvini G., M., Kharrat, R., Masihi, M., A new mathematical model for force gravity drainage in fractured porous media, Transport Porous Media, 2010, Vol. 83, pp711–724.
52.	Tahmasebi, H.A., Kharrat, R., Soltanieh, M.: Dimensionless correlation for prediction of permeability reduction rate due to calcium sulfate scale deposition in carbonate grain packed column, J. of the Taiwan Institute of Chemical Engineers, Vol. 4 No. 3 May 2010, pp268–278.
53.	Ghazanfari M. H., Kharrat R., Rashtchian D. Vossoughi S., Statistical Model for Dispersion in a 2D Glass Micromodel, SPE Journal, Vol. 15, No. 2, June 2010, pp301–312.
54.	Rostami B., Kharrat R., Ghotbi S., Darvish F.,  Gas-Oil Relative Permeability and Residual Oil Saturation as Related to Displacement Instability and Dimensionless numbers, Oil & Gas Science and Technology-Revue de l'IFP, Vol. 65 (2010), No. 2, pp. 299–313. 
55.	Dehghan, A.A., Farzaneh, S.A., Kharrat, R., Ghazanfari, M.: Pore level investigation of heavy oil recovery during water alternating solvent injection processes, accepted for published in journal of Trans. Porous media, Aug, DOI 10.1007/11242-009-9463-5, (2010) 83:653–666.
56.	Dehghan A.A,  Kharrat R., Ghazanfari M.H,: Visualization and quantification of asphaltene heavy oil displacement by co-solvents at different wettability conditions, Petroleum Science and Technology, Vol. 28 (2010), pp 176–189.
57.	Dehghan, A.A., Kharrat, R.,  Ghazanfari, M., Vossoughi, Sh.: Quantifying the role of pore geometry and medium heterogeneity on heavy oil recovery during solvent/co solvent flooding in water wet systems, accepted for publication in journal of porous media, 14(4):363–373(2011).
58.	Mahdavi S., Kharrat R.: Asphaltene Precipitation Prediction Using Micellization Model Based on Experimental Data, published in J. petroleum science and technology, 29: 11, 1133-1146, April 2011.
59.	Alizadeh, A., Nakhli, H., Kharrat, R., Ghazanfari, M.: Experimental Investigation of Asphaltene Precipitation during Natural Production of Heavy and Light Oil Reservoirs: The Role of Pressure and Temperature, J. Petroleum Science and Technology, 29: 10, 1054 — 1065, March, 2011.
60.	Shahvar M.B., Kharrat R., Badounak N. D.: A new approach for compressional slowness modeling using wavelet coefficients, Energy Sources Part A Recovery Utilization and Environmental Effects 01 (2011); 36(19).
61.	Nikpoor, M.H., Kharrat, R., Zhangxin, C.: Modeling of compositional grading and plus fraction properties changes with depth in petroleum reservoirs, published in journal of petroleum science and technology, 29: 9, 914 – 923, March 2011.
62.	Nikpoor, M.H., Kharrat, R.: Introducing a New Method of Predicting PVT Properties for Iranian Crude Oils Applying Artificial Neural Networks, Journal of petroleum science and technology, 29: 10, (2011), 1066 – 1079.
63.	Pak, T., Kharrat, R., Bagheri, M., Khalilia, M., Hematfar., V.: Experimental study of Asphaltene deposition during different production mechanisms, Journal of petroleum science and technology (JPST), Vol. 29, Issue 17, 2011, pp. 1853–1863.
64.	 Naseryan  Moghadam, J., Salahshoor,  K., Kharrat, R. Introducing a New Method for Predicting PVT Properties of Iranian Crude Oils Applying Artificial Neural Networks, published in J. Petroleum Science & Technology, 29: 10, 1066 - 1079, March 2011.
65.	Fatemi S.M, Kharrat R.: Assessment of Vapor Extraction (VAPEX) process performance in naturally fractured reservoirs, Journal of Petroleum Science and Engineering, Volume 75, Issues 3-4, January 2011, Pages 260-273.
66.	Yadali J. B., Kharrat R., Torabi F.: The influence of pore wettability on the microstructure of residual oil in surfactant-enhanced water flooding in heavy oil reservoirs: Implications for pore-scale flow characterization, Journal of Petroleum Science and Engineering, Volume 77, Issue 1, April 2011, Pages 121-134.
67.	Shahvar M.B., Dashtbesh N., and Kharrat R.: A new Domain for Reservoir Properties Characterization: Energy Sources Part A Recovery Utilization and Environmental Effects, Jan 2011.
68.	Yadali J.B., Kharrat, R.: The influence of pore geometric characteristics on flow instability and micro scale physical displacement mechanisms of dilute surfactant flooding in mixed wet porous media, to be published in the Journal of  Porous Media  volume 14, 2011.
69.	Fatemi S.M.; Kharrat R.; Ghotbi C., The Assessment of Fracture Geometrical Properties on the Performance of Conventional In-Situ Combustion, Journal of Petroleum Science and Technology, 29: 6, pp. 613 – 625, February 2011.
70.	Rasti F.; Masihi M.; Kharrat R., The Semi-Analytical Modeling and Simulation of the VAPEX Process of “Kuh-e-Mond” Heavy Oil Reservoir, Journal of Petroleum Science and Technology, 29: 5, 535 - 548, January 2011.
71.	Shahvar M.B., Dashtbesh N., and Kharrat R.: A new approach for compressional modeling using wavelet coefficients, Energy Sources Part A Recovery Utilization and Environmental Effects, Jan 2011.
72.	Najafi, S. M., Mousavi M. R., Ghazanfari M. H, Ghotbi C., Ramazani A., Kharrat R., and Amani M., Quantifying the Role of Ultrasonic Wave Radiation on Kinetics of Asphaltene Aggregation in a Toluene–Pentane Mixture, Journal of Petroleum Science and Technology, Vol 29, Issue 9 (2011), 29: PP 966–974.
73.	Rezaeipour A.R.; Kharrat R. Ghazanfari M.H.; Yasari E., The Role of Throat Orientation on Dispersion of Solvent in Crude Oil-Saturated Porous Media, Journal of Petroleum Science and Engineering, Vol 29, Issue : 6, (2011) 649 – 663.
74.	Yadali Jamaloei B., Kharrat R., Asghari K., Torabi F., The influence of pore wettability on the microstructure of residual oil in surfactant-enhanced water flooding in heavy oil reservoirs: Implications for pore-scale flow characterization, Journal of Petroleum Science and Engineering, February, Volume 77, Issue 1, April 2011, Pages 121-134. 
75.	Emami H., Kharrat R., Wang X., Study of Microscopic and Macroscopic Displacement Behaviors of Polymer Solution in Water-Wet and Oil-Wet Media, journal of Transp Porous Med, Volume 89, Number 2011, 97-120, DOI: 10.1007/s11242-011-9754-5 
76.	Mirjordavi N., Kazemeini M., R. Kharrat R., Ghazanfari M.H., Salehi A., Experimental Investigation of Gas-Heavy Oil Molecular Diffusion Coefficient in Porous Media: Experimental Results for CO2 in Iranian Crudes, journal of Defect and Diffusion Forum Vols. 312-315 (2011) pp 1049–1054, April 2011.
77.	Naseryan Moghadam, J., Salahshoor, K., Kharrat, R.: Intelligent Prediction of Porosity and Permeability from Well Logs for One of the Iranian Fractured Carbonate Reservoirs, J. Petroleum Science & Technology, Vol. 29, issue 20, 2095 - 2112, August 2011.
78.	Tavakkoli M. Masihi M., Ghazanfari M. H.,  Kharrat R., An improvement of thermodynamic Micellization model for prediction of asphaltene precipitation during gas injection in heavy crude, Fluid Phase Equilibria, June 2011, 308 (2011) 153– 163.
79.	Fatemia S.M., Kharrat R. & Vossoughi S.: Investigation of the Effect of Geometrical Properties of Networked Fractures on the Efficiency of Steam-Assisted Gravity Drainage Process, Vol 29, Issue 16, 2011, pp. 1625–1636.
80.	Fatemi S.M, Kharrat R., Ghotbi C.: Toe-to-Heel Air Injection: Investigation of the Effect of Fractures Geometrical Properties on Process Performance, Energy Sources, part A: Recovery, Utilization, and Environmental Effects, Vol. 33, Issue 22, 2011.
81.	Dehghan A.A,  Farzaneh S.A., Kharrat R., Ghazanfari M.H., Masihi M., Experimental and Simulation Studies of the Effect of Vertical Permeability Barriers on Oil Recovery Efficiency During Solvent Injection Processes, Energy Sources, part A: Recovery, Utilization, and Environmental Effects, Vol. 33, Issue 20, 2011, pp. 1889–1900.
82.	Pourabdollah K, Zarringhalam M. A., Kharrat R., Mokhtari B.: Improvement of Heavy Oil Recovery in the VAPEX Process using Montmorillonite Nanoclays, Oil & Gas Science and Technology-Revue de l'IFP, Vol. 68 (2011), No. 3, pp. 507–519.
83.	Yadali B. and Kharrat R.,” Lessons learned from miscible gas flooding in naturally fractured reservoirs: integrated studies and pilot and field cases”, Petroleum Science and Technology, Vol. 30 (2012), pp1802–1812.
84.	Akhlaghi N., Kharrat R., Mahdavi S.,”Gas Assisted Gravity Drainage by CO2  Injection”, Journal Energy Sources, Part A: Recovery, Utilization, and Environmental Effects, Volume: 34, Issue: 17, (2012)  pages 1619 - 1627.
85.	Hematfar V., Bagheri, M.B, Kharrat, R., Gazanfari M. H., Ghotbi, C: Optimization assisted of asphaltene deposition modeling in porous media during modeling in porous media during natural depletion scheme, Journal of Petroleum Science and Technology, Vol 30, Issue 09, (2012), pp 958–965.
86.	Dehghan A.A., Kharrat R., Ghazanfari M.H., “Visualization and Quantification of Asphaltinic-Heavy Oil Displacement by Co-Solvents at Different Wettability Conditions”. Journal of Petroleum Science and Technology, Volume 28, Issue 2, 2012, pages 176-189.
87.	Mashayekhizadeh V., Kharrat, R., Ghazanfari M. H.,: Experimental Investigation of Fracture Tilt Angle Effects on Frequency and Stability of Liquid Bridges in Fractured Porous Media, Journal of Petroleum Science and Technology, Vol. 30, Issue 09, (2012), pp 807–816.
88.	Yadali B. and Kharrat R.,”The performance evaluation of viscous-modified surfactant waterflooding in heavy oil reservoirs at varying salinity of injected polymer contained surfactant solution”, Iran J. Chem. Eng., Vol. 31, No. 1, 2012, pp 99–111.
89.	Kharrat R.: Toe-to-Heel Air Injection (THAI): Investigation of the Effect of Fractures Geometrical Properties on Process Performance”, Energy Sources, part A: Recovery, Utilization, and Environmental Effects, Vol. 33, Issue 22, 2012, pp. 2067–2077.
90.	Mousavifar M. A., Kharrat R., Parchizadeh A., Mahdavi S.: Comparison between EOR methods (Gas Injection, Water injection and WAG Process) in one of Iranian Fractured Oil Reservoirs, International Journal of Scientific & Engineering Research, Vol 3, Issue 4, April 2012.
91.	Gandomkar A. and Kharrat R.: The tertiary FAWAG process on gas and water invaded zones: An experimental study”, Energy Sources, part A: Recovery, Utilization, and Environmental Effects, Vol. 34, 2012, pp. 1913–1922.
92.	Gandomkar A. and Kharrat R., Motealleh M., Khanamiri H.H., Nematzadeh M., and Ghazanfari M.H.: An experimental in investigation of foam for gas mobility control in a low temperature fractured carbonate reservoir, Petroleum Science and Technology, Vol. 30 (2012), pp 976–98.
93.	Askarinezad R., Kharrat R., Shadezadeh S. R.,: A New Approach to Modeling the Simple Re-infiltration Phenomenon in Naturally Fractured Reservoirs, Petroleum Science and Technology, Vol. 30, Issue 10,  (2012), pp 1004–1020.
94.	Kharrat R., Operational and Reservoir Parameters Influencing the Performance of Top-down In-Situ Combustion (ISC) in Fractured Reservoirs: 2D Block Scale Simulation of Networked Fractures, Petroleum Science and Technology, Vol. 30, Issue 03, (2012), pp 256–270.
95.	Kharrat R., A Breakthrough in Controlling Lost Circulation in Pay Zone by Optimizing Particle Size Distribution of Shellfish and Limestone Chips, Petroleum Science and Technology, Vol. 30, Issue 03, (2012), pp 290–306.

96.	Gandomkar A. and Kharrat R.: Anionic surfactant adsorption through porous media in carbonate cores: An experimental study”, Energy Sources, part A: Recovery, Utilization, and Environmental Effects, Vol. 35, 2012, pp. 58–65-1922.
97.	Farzaneh S.A., Dehgan A.A., Ghazanfari M.H., and Kharrat R.: A comparative study on WAS, SWAS, and Solvent soak scenarios applied to heavy oil reservoirs using five spot glass micro models, Journal of Canadian Petroleum Technology (2012), PP. 383–392.
98.	Heydarian A., Kharrat R., Hashemi A.,: The impact of sparkling mechanism on improving oil recovery in nano-particle injection through pseudo 3 dimensional micro models, Journal of American Science, vol. 11 (2012), pp. 379– 384.
99.	Nematzadeh M,  Khanamiri A., Aghajani M., Kharrat R., Gandomkar S., Mottealleh A., Ghazanfari M. H., Experimental Study of Secondary WAG Injection in A Low-temperature Carbonate Reservoir in Different Miscibility Conditions, Petroleum Science and Technology, Vol. 30, Issue 13, (2012), pp 1359–1369.

100.	 Chekani M. and Kharrat R., An integrated reservoir characterization analysis in a carbonate reservoir: A case study, Petroleum Science and Technology, Vol. 30 (2012), pp 1468–1485.
101.	Bolouri H., Schaffie M, ., Kharrat R., Ghazanfari M.H., Ghoodjani E, An Experimental and Modeling Study of Asphaltene Deposition due to CO2 Miscible Injection, Journal of Petroleum Science and Technology, Volume: 31, Issue: 02, (2012) pages 129 – 141.
102.	Sadati S. E., Kharrat R., Scaling of Gas Assisted Gravity Drainage Process using Dimensionless Groups, Journal of Energy Sources, Part A: Recovery, Utilization, and Environmental Effects, Volume: 35, Issue: 02, (2012) pages 164 - 172.
103.	Mohammadi S., Maghzi A., Ghazanfari M. H., Massihi M., Kharrat R., On the Control of Glass Micromodel Characteristics Developed by Laser Technology, Journal of Energy Sources, Part A: Recovery, Utilization, and Environmental Effects, Volume: 35, Issue: 03, (2012) pages 193 - 201.
104.	Bostan M., Kharrat R., Barjas A.: Injection Efficiency and Water Loss Optimization Using Streamline Simulation in Water Flooding Process, Petroleum Science and Technology, Vol. 31, Issue 14 (2013), pp 1477–1487.
105.	Kharrat R., Effect of Fractures Geometrical Properties on the Recovery Mechanism of Top-Down In-Situ Combustion Process, Journal: Petroleum Science and Technology, Volume: 30, Issue: 02 (2013) pages 147 - 158.  
106.	Motealleh M., Kharrat R., Hashemi A. N, An Experimental Investigation of Water-Alternating-CO2 Coreflooding in a Carbonate Oil Reservoir in Different Initial Core Conditions, Journal of Energy Sources, Part A: Recovery, Utilization, and Environmental Effects, Volume: 35, Issue: 13 (2013) pages 1187 - 1196.
107.	Bina O., Kharrat R., Shadizadeh S.R., The Proper Simulation of Free Fall Gravity Drainage in the Commercial Simulator Environment, Journal of: Energy Sources, Part A: Recovery, Utilization, and Environmental Effects, Volume: 35, Issue: 12, (2013)  pages 1161 – 1173.
108.	Saidian M., Ghazanfari M.H.N Massihi M., Kharrat R., Monitoring the Role of Fracture Geometrical Characteristics on Fingering Initiation/Development during Heavy Oil Miscible Displacements in Fractured Porous Media, Journal of Energy Sources, Part A: Recovery, Utilization, and Environmental Effects, Volume: 35, Issue: 12, (2013), pages 1129 - 1139.
109.	Kharrat R., Intelligent Prediction of Porosity and Permeability from Well Logs for One of the Iranian Fractured Carbonate Reservoirs Journal of Petroleum Science and Technology, Volume: 29, Issue: 20, (2013), pages 2095 - 2112.  
110.	Zargaria H., Poordada S., Kharrat R., Porosity and Permeability Prediction Based on Computational Intelligences as Artificial Neural Networks (ANNs) and Adaptive Neuro-Fuzzy Inference Systems (ANFIS) in Southern Carbonate Reservoir of Iran Journal of Petroleum Science and Technology, Volume: 31, Issue: 10, (2013) pages 1066 - 1077.
111.	Heidari P., Alizadeh N., Kharrat R., Ghazanfari M. H., Souri A. L., Experimental Analysis of Secondary Gas Injection Strategies Journal: Petroleum Science and Technology, Volume: 31, Issue: 08, (2013), pages, 2013, 797 - 802.
112.	 Sadati S.E., Kharrat R., Flow Regime Characterization of Gas-Assisted Gravity Drainage (GAGD) Process, Journal of Energy Sources, Part A: Recovery, Utilization, and Environmental Effects, Volume: 35, Issue: 07, (2013) pages 629 - 634.
113.	Zagari H., Farasat A., Kharrat R., Permeability Prediction Based on Hydraulic Flow Units (HFUs) and Adaptive Neuro-Fuzzy Inference Systems (ANFIS) in Iranian Southern Oilfield, Journal of Petroleum Science and Technology, Volume: 31, Issue: 05, (2013) pages 540 - 549.  
114.	Zareh N., Kharrat R., Ghazanfari M. H., An Experimental Investigation of Effect of Fracture Dip Angle on Oil Recovery and Drainage Rate in Free Fall Gravity Drainage in Fractured Reservoirs Using Glass Micromodel (A Pore Level Investigation), Journal of Petroleum Science and Technology, Volume: 31, Issue: 04, (2013) pages 355 - 367. 

116.	Khalili M., Kharrat R., Salahshoor K., Haghighat Sefat M., Fluid injection optimization using modified globle dynamic harmony, Iranian J. Oil&Gas and Technology, Vol 2(2013) No. 2, pp. 57–72.
117.	Bostan M., Kharrat R., Ali Barjas Ali, Injection Efficiency and Water Loss Optimization Using Streamline Simulation in Water Flooding Process, Journal of Petroleum Science and Technology, Vol. 31, Issue 14 (2013) pp. 1477–1487.
118.	Haghi A.H., Kharrat R., Asef M.R., Rezazadegan H.: Present day stress of the central Persian Gulf: Implications for drilling and well performance, Tectonophysics 608 (2013) 1429-1441.
119.	Haghi A.H., Kharrat R., Asef M.R., : A case study for HCL-based fracturing and stress determination: A Deformation/Diffusion/Thermal approach, Journal of Petroleum Sciene & Engineering 11(2103) 105-116.
120.	Chalangarana V., Firooziniab H., Kharrat R.,  Chalangarand N., Generation of Asphaltene Deposition Envelope Using Artificial Neural Network, Journal of Dispersion Science and Technology, 2014. Vol 35, Issue 3, (2014), pp. 313–321..
122.	 Bagherzadeha H.,  Ghazanfaria M.H, Kharrat R., Rashtchian D., Experimental Investigation and Modeling of Permeability Impairment Mechanisms Due to Asphaltene Precipitation Under CO2 Injection Conditions, J. Energy Sources, Part A: Recovery, Utilization, and Environmental Effects, Vol 36, Issue 6, (2014), pp. 591–604.
124.	Karambeghi M.A., Kharrat R., An Investigation of Inhibitors Performance on Asphaltene Precipitation Due to Associated Gas Injection, Journal of Petroleum Science and Technology, Vol. 32, Issue 10 (2014) pp. 1213–1218.
125.	Karambeghi M.A., Kharrat R., An Investigation of Inhibitors Performance on Asphaltene Precipitation Due to CO2 Injection, Journal of Petroleum Science and Technology, Vol. 32, Issue 10 (2014) pp. 1327–1332.
126.	Zeyghamia M.,  Kharrata R. ,Ghazanfarib M. H., Investigation of the Applicability of Nano Silica Particles as a Thickening Additive for Polymer Solutions Applied in EOR Processes, J. Energy Sources, Part A: Recovery, Utilization, and Environmental Effects, Volume 36, Issue 12, (2014),PP.  1315–1324. 
127.	 Hasanvand M., Kharrat R., the Thermodynamic Modeling of Asphaltene Precipitation Equilibrium during the Natural Production of Crude Oil: The Role of Pressure and Temperature, Journal of Petroleum Science and Technology, Vol. 32, Issue 10 (2014) pp. 1578–1585.
128.	Daryasafar A., Ahadi A., Kharrat R., Modeling of steam distillation mechanism during steam injection process using artificial intelligence, The Scientific World Journal, Volume 2014, (2014) 8 pages.
129.	Karambeghi M.A., Kharrat R., Asphaltene Precipitation during different production operations, Journal of Petroleum Science and Technology, Vol. 32, Issue 14 (2014) pp. 1655–1660.
130.	 Kamalyar K., Kharrat R. & Nikbakhtb M., Numerical Aspects of the Convection–Dispersion Equation, Journal of Petroleum Science and Technology, Vol. 32, Issue 14 (2014) pp. 1729–1762.
131.	Alizadeh A., H. Nakhli H., Kharrat R., Ghazanfari M.H.  & Aghajani M., Experimental Study of Asphaltene Precipitation Behavior during Miscible Carbon Dioxide Injection, J. Energy Sources, Part A: Recovery, Utilization, and Environmental Effects, Volume 36, Issue 14, 2014, Pages 1523-1530.
132.	Shojaiepour A., Kharrat R., Hashemi A., Experimental and simulation of In situ combustion process in carbonated fractured porous media, Journal of the Japan Petroleum Institute, 2014, Vol. 57 No. 4.
133.	Razminia K, Razminia A., Kharrat R., Baleanu D., “ Analysis of diffusivity equation using differential quadrature method, Romanian Journal of Physics, 2014,Vol. 59, Nos-3-4, pp 233–246.
134.	Shavar M.B, Kharrat R., Dashtbesh, Deriving Relative Permeability from Capillary Pressure Using Gaussian and Rational Equations, Energy Sources, Part A: Recovery, Utilization, and Environmental Effects, Volume 36, Issue 15, 2014, Pages 1681-1696.
135.	 Ahmadi Y.,  Kharrat R., Hashemi A., Bahrami P. & Mahdavi S., The Effect of Temperature and Pressure on the Reversibility of Asphaltene Precipitation, Journal of Petroleum Science and Technology,Volume 36, Issue 15, 2014, Pages 1681-1696.
136.	Rezaei M., Shadizadeh S. R., Vosoughi M. & Kharrat R. An Experimental Investigation of Sequential CO2 and N2 Gas Injection as a New EOR Method, Energy Sources, Part A: Recovery, Utilization, and Environmental Effects, Vol. 36, Issue 17, 2014, pp. 1938–1948.
137.	Ahmadi Y. & Kharrat R., A Compositional Reservoir Simulation and Experimental Investigation of Asphaltene Onset Pressure, Journal of Petroleum Science and Technology, Vol. 32, Issue 18 (2014) pp. 2253–2262.
138.	Zarghertalebi M, Barati N, Kharrat R., Influences of Hydrophilic and Hydrophobic silica nanoparticles on anionic surfactant properties: Interfacial and adsorption behaviors, Journal of Petroleum Science and Engineering, Vol 119 (2014) 36-43.
139.	Farrokhrouz M., Reza Asef  R., Kharrat R., Empirical estimation of uniaxal compressive strength of shale formations, GEOPHYSICS, Volume 79, Issue 4, July 2014.
140.	 Khalili M., Kharrat R., Salahshoor K., Haghighat S. M., Global Dynamic Harmony Search algorithm GDHS, Applied Mathematics and Computation, Volume 228, 1 February 2014, Pages 195-219.
141.	Ahmadi Y., Hasanbaghi M, Kharrat R.: A Comparison of Natural Depletion and Different Scenarios of Injection in the Reservoir from the Beginning of Oil Production, Journal of Petroleum Science and Technology, Vol. 32, Issue 21 (2014) pp. 2559–2565.
144.	Fallahnejad G., Kharrat R., Fully Implicit Compositional Simulator for Modeling of Asphaltene Deposition during Natural Depletion, Fluid Phase Equilibria, Volume 398, 25 July 2015, pp 15–25.
145.	Dolatia S., Zareia H., Kharrat R., Asphaltene Instability Trends of Light and Heavy Crude Oils, Journal of Dispersion Science and Technology, Volume 35 Issue 7, January 2015, pages 970-983.
146.	Zargartalebi M., Kharrat R., Barati N., Enhancement of surfactant flooding performance by the use of silica nanoparticles, Fuel, Volume 143, 1 March 2015, Pages.
147.	 Miri R., Shadizadeh S.R., Kharrat R., Proper implementation of Gas-Oil Gravity Drainage Transfer Function in Dual Porosity Simulators, Energy Sources, Part A: Recovery, Utilization, and Environmental Effect, 2015, 37, pp 114–1144.
148.	Kharrat R., Asphaltene laboratory assessment of a heavy onshore reservoir during pressure, temperature and composition variations to predict asphaltene onset pressure, Korean Journal of Chemical Engineering, Vol 32, Issue 2, pp 316–322.
149.	Kharrat R., Worm-like micelles: A new approach for heavy oil recovery from fractured systems, The Canadian Journal of Chemical Engineering, Vol. 93, Issue 5, 2015, pp 33–43.
150.	Bahrami M., Kharrat R., Mahdavi S., Ahmadi Y., and James L.: Asphaltene laboratory assessment of a heavy onshore reservoir during pressure, temperature and composition variations to predict asphaltene onset pressure, Korean J. Chem. Eng., 32(2), 316-322 (2015).
152.	Shadizadeh S.S. and Kharrat R.: Experimental Investigation of Matricaria chamomilla Extract Effect on Oil-Water Interfacial Tension: Usable for Chemical Enhanced Oil Recovery, Petroleum Science and Technology, Vol 33, Issue 8, 2015, pp 901–907.
153.	Daryasafar A., Amareh I., FathiNasab M., Kharrat R., Jalilian M, Application of the transient rate decline analysis for determining average reservoir pressure in naturally fractured reservoirs, PETROLEUM EXPLORATION AND DEVELOPMENT, Volume 42, Issue 2, April 2015,254–258.
154.	Miri R., Shadizadeh S.R. & Kharrat R.: Static Stability of Liquid Bridges Between Matrix Blocks of a Gas Invaded Zone of Naturally Fractured Reservoirs, Journal of Petroleum Science Technology, Vol 33, Issue 17-18 (2015) 1541-1551.
155.	Bahrami M., Kharrat R., Mahdavi S., Firoozinia H.: Prediction of the Gas Injection Effect on the Asphaltene Phase Envelope, Oil and Gas Science and Technology – Rev. IFP Energies nouvelles, Vol. 70(2015), No. 6, pp. 1075–1086.
156.	Dolatia S., Zareia H., Kharrat R., Asphaltene Instability Trends to Predict Asphaltene Precipitation Onset Pressure: Constrained for Light and Heavy Crude Oils, Journal of Dispersion Science and Technology, Volume 36 Issue 1, January 2015, pages 103-110.
158.	Ghahfarokhi A. Kh., Kharrat R., Soltani B.: Investigation of the asphaltene deposition along the flow of oil in tubing: Experimental study and a parametric analysis, Journal of Petroleum Science Technology, Vol. 34, Issue 10 (2016) 884-890.
159.	Karambeigia A. M.,  Nikazar, M., Kharrat R., Experimental evaluation of asphaltene inhibitors selection for standard and reservoir conditions, Journal of Petroleum Science and Engineering, Vol 137 (2016) 74-86.
160.	Pendar H., Salehi M.M, Kharrat R., Zarezadeh S., Numerical and ANFIS modeling of the effect of fracture parameters on the performance of VAPEX process, Journal of Petroleum Science and Engineering, Volume 143, July 2016,pp. 128–140.
161.	Karambeigia A. M.,  Nikazar, M., Kharrat R., A novel approach for asphaltene inhibitor modeling, Journal of Petroleum Science Technology, Vol. 34(3), (2016), pp. 274–279.1808-1814.
163.	Kor P. and Kharrat R., Prediction of the asphaltene deposition profile along a wellbore during natural production from a reservoir, Energy Sources, Part A: Recovery, Utilization, and Environmental Effect, 2016, 38, issue 19, pp 2837–2844.
164.	Kor P., Kharrat R. and Ayoubi A., Comparison and Evaluation of several models in prediction of asphaltene deposition profile along an oil well: a case study, J. Petrol Explor Prod Technol, in press, 2016.
165.	Moghaddam M.H. and Kharrat R., A study on the effect of surrounding faults on optimization of improve oil recovery process by using a genetic algorithm self code, Int. J. Petroleum Engineering, Vol. 2, No. 1, 2016, pp. 60– 78.
166.	Kor P. and Kharrat R., Modeling of Asphaltene Particle Deposition from Turbulent Oil Flow in Tubing: Model Validation and a Parametric Study, Petroleum, in press2016.
167.	Khorram A. G., Kharrat R., Soltani S. B., Investigation of the asphaltene deposition along the flow of the oil in tubing: Experimental study and a parametric analysis, Journal of Petroleum Science Technology, Vol. 34(10), (2016), pp. 884–890.
168.	 Khorram A. G., Kor P., Kharrat R., Soltani S. B., Characterization of Asphaltene Deposition Process in Flow Loop Apparatus; an Experimental Investigation and Modeling Approach, J. of Petroleum Science and Engineering, PETROL3917 in press, 2017.
169.	Rastgoo A. and Kharrat R., Investigation of Asphaltene Deposition and Precipitation in Production Tubing, International Journal of Clean Coal and Energy, 2017, Vol. 6, pp. 14–29.
170.	Akhlaghi N., Kharrat R., Rezaei F., Optimizing the location of the gas injection well during gas assisted gravity drainage in a fractured carbonated reservoir using artificial intelligence, Theoretical Foundation of Chemical Engineering, 2017, Volume 51, Issue 1, pp65–69.
171.	Daruasafar A., Joukar M., Fathinsadab M., Da Part G., and Kharrat R., Journal of Earth Science Vol. 28 No. 5 Oct. 2017, pp. 842–847.
172.	 P., Kharrat R., Hashemi A., Zalaghi M., Experimental evaluation of carbonated waterflooding: A practical process for enhanced oil recovery and geological CO2 storage, Greenhouse Gases, Science and technology J., vol. 8, Issue 2, April 2018, pp. 238–256.

SPE papers

1.	Kharrat R. and Vossoughi S.: Feasibility Study of the In-Situ Combustion Process Using TGA/DSC Techniques, J. Pet. Tech., Vol. 37, No. 9, August 1985, pp. 1141–1445, Trans. Soc. Pet Eng., Vol. 279.
2.	Asghari, K., Kharrat, R. and Vossoughi S.: Alteration of Permeability by Fine Particle Movement- a Water Injectivity Problem, SPE 29006, Proceedings of the International Symposium on Oilfield Chemistry, San Antonio, Texas, U.S.A, 1995, PP. 655–665.
3.	Behbahani, H.S., Kharrat R. and Vossoughi S.: Case History of a Unique Gas Injection Scheme and its Simulation Using Material Balance Based Simulator, SPE 35631, Proceeding of the SPE Gas Technology Symposium, Calgary, Alberta, Canada, 1996, pp. 515–523.
4.	Azin R., Kharrat R., Ghotbi S. and S. Vossoughi, Applicability of the VAPEX Process to Iranian heavy oil Reservoir, SPE 92720, Presented at the MEOS, Bahrain, March 2005.
5.	Rostami, B., Azin, R., Kharrat R.: Investigation of the VAPEX process in high pressure fractured heavy oil reservoirs, SPE 97766, 2005.  
6.	Azin R, Kharrat R., Rostami B., Investigations of the VAPEX Process in high pressured fractured heavy oil reservoirs, SPE 99766, presented at the international thermal operations and heavy oil symposium held in Calgary, 2005.
7.	Razzaghi S., Kharrat R., Vossoughi S., Feasibility study of auto ignition process in heavy reservoirs, SPE 97887, presented at the international thermal operations and heavy oil symposium held in Calgary, 2005.
8.	Farshad s., Kharrat R., S. Vossoughi, Feasibility study of the in situ combustion for fractured reservoir, SPE 103969, Presented at the International oil conference exhibition, Mexico, 2006.
9.	Behrouz T., Kharrat R., Ghazanfari M. H., Experimental Investigation of Miscible Injection using Micro model, presented at the 11th National Iranian Chemical Engineering Congress, Tehran, Nov. 2006.
10.	Hemmati N, Kharrat R., A Correlation Approach for Prediction of Crude oil PVT Properties, SPE 104543, Presented at the MEOS, Bahrain, March 2007.
11.	Tahmasebi H. A., Kharrat R., R. Masoudi, Prediction of Permeability Reduction Rate due to Calcium Sulfate Scale Formation in Porous Media, SPE 105105, Presented at the MEOS, Bahrain, March 2007.
12.	 Saraji S., Kharrat R, S. Razzaghi, V. Taghikhani,   Kinetic Study of Crude Oil Combustion in the Presence of Carbonate Rock, SPE 105112, Presented at the MEOS, Bahrain, March 2007.
13.	Mostafavi S.V., Kharrat R., S. Razzaghi, Feasibility Study of In-Situ Combustion in a Carbonate Reservoir, SPE 105576, Presented at the MEOS, Bahrain, March 2007.
14.	Jahanshahi E., Salahshoor K., Kharrat R., Modeling and Simulation of Instabilities in Gas-Lifted Oil Wells, SPE 112108, Presented at the 2008 North Africa Technical Conference And Exhibition in Morocco, 2008.
15.	Ghazanfari M. H., Kharrat R., Rashtchian D. Vossoughi S., Statistical Model of Dispersion in a 2-D Glass Micro model, SPE 113343, Presented at the 2008 SPE Improved Oil Recovery Symposium held in Tulsa, Oklahoma, 2008.
16.	Emami Meybodi H., Kharrat R., Ghazanfari M. H., Effect of Heterogeneity of Layered Reservoirs on Polymer Flooding: An Experimental Approach Using Five-Spot Glass Micromodel, SPE 113820, Will be presented at the 2008 SPE Europec/EAGE Annual Conference and Exhibition held in Rome, Italy, 9–12 June 2008.
17.	Kharrat R., Mahvadi R., Bagherpour M.B., Hejri S.: Rock type and permeability prediction of a heterogeneous carbonate reservoir using artificial neural networks based on Flow Zone Index approach, SPE 120166, Presented at the MEOS, Bahrain, March 2009.
18.	Mahdavi, R., Kharrat R.: Integration of 3D seismic attributes and well logs for electrofacies mapping and prediction of reliable petrophysical properties, SPE 121214, presented at the EAGE/SPE 2009, Netherland.
19.	Ardali M., Kharrat R., B. Rostami and M. Derakhshanfar, Partial Movement of Asphaltene in Presence of Connate water in Vapex Process, SPE121988, Presented at the 2009 SPE EUROPES/EAGE Annual Conference and Exhibition held in Amsterdam, June 2009.
20.	Yadali Jamaloie, B., Kharrat, R., Ahmadloo, F.: Selection of proper criteria I flow behavior characterization of low tension polymer flooding in heavy oil reservoirs, SPE 127606, 2009.

21.	Chekani, M., Kharrat, R.: Reservoir rock typing in a carbonate reservoir a cooperation of core and log data: case study, SPE 123703, 2009.
22.	Dehghan, AA., Kharrat, R., Ghazanfari, M., Farzaneh, S.A.: Studying the effect of pore geometry, wettability and co-solvent types on the efficiency of solvent flooding to heavy oil in five-spot models, SPE 123315, 2009.
23.	Bagheri, M.B., Kharrat, R., Mirzabozora, A., Ghotbi, C., Dastkhan, Z.: A novel method to develop a new scaling equation for modeling of asphaltene precipitation, SPE 125567, Abudhabi 2009.
24.	Tavakkoli, M., Kharrat, R., Inaloo, s.: SGS versus collected Cokriging petrophysical modeling: a comparative study in a heterogeneous gas condensate carbonate reservoir, SPE 127381, SPE oil and gas conference India, 20-22 Jan 2010.
25.	Hematfar, V., Kharrat, R., Ghazanfari, M.  Bagheri, M.B.: Modeling and Optimization of Asphaltene Deposition in Porous Media Using Genetic Algorithm Technique, SPE 130455, 2010.
26.	Farzaneh S.A., Kharrat R., and M.H. Ghazanfari M.H.: Experimental Study of Solvent Flooding to Heavy Oil in Fractured Five-Spot Micro-Models: The Role of Fracture Geometrical Characteristics, SPE 134246, 2010.
27.	Chekani M. Bagherpour M.H., Alavi M., Kharrat R.: Novel approach to mitigate gas production in a high GOR Carbonate reservoir drilled wells-Case study, SPE 135875, 2010.
28.	Afshari S., Kharrat R., Ghazanfari M.H.: Asphaltene Precipitation Study during Natural Depletion at Reservoir Conditions, SPE 130071, 2010.
29.	Mohammad B.S., Kharrat R., Matin M.: Applying Flow Zone Index Approach and Artificial Neural Networks Modeling Technique foe characterizing a Heterogeneous Carbonate Reservoir Using Dynamic Data: Case Study of an Iranian Carbonate Reservoir, SPE 132898, 2010.
30.	Jabbari H., Zeng z., Kharrat R., Mostafavi V.H., Emamzadeh A., Modeling the Toe-to-Heel Air Injection Process by Introducing a New Method of Type-curve Match, SPE 132515, 2010.
31.	Chekani M. Bagherpour M.H., Alavi M., Kharrat R.: Novel approach to mitigate gas production in a high GOR Carbonate reservoir drilled wells-Case study, SPE 135875, 2010.
32.	Nazari N M., Zargari H, Ashena R., Kharrat R., Permeability Prediction of Un-cored Intervals Using New IMLR Method and Artificial Neural Networks: A Case Study of Bangestan Field, Iran, SPE 140682, Nigeria Annual International Conference and Exhibition, 31 July - 7 August 2010, Tinapa - Calabar, Nigeria.
33.	Moradi B.,  Malekzadeh E., Amani M., Boukadi F.H.,  Kharrat R., Bubble Point Pressure Empirical Correlation, SPE 132756, Trinidad and Tobago Energy Resources Conference, 27–30 June 2010, Port of Spain, Trinidad.
34.	Jamaloei Y., Kharrat R., Torabi F.: Analysis and Correlations of Viscous Fingering in Low-Tension Polymer Flooding in Heavy Oil Reservoirs, SPE 137445, 2010.
35.	Jamaloei Y., Kharrat R., Torabi F.: A Mechanistic Analysis of Viscous Instability in Low-Tension Polymer Flooding in Heavy-Oil Reservoirs, SPE 138127, 2010.

36.	

37.	Bostan M., Kharrat R., Ghorbani D.: Implementing a Novel Method for Injection Efficiency Optimization in Water Flooding Process: Case Study, SPE 142133, 2011.
38.	Fatemi S.M.; Cyrus Ghotbi C., Kharrat R., Badakhshan A., Application of Toe-to-Heel Air Injection (THAI) Process in Fractured Carbonate Systems: 3D Simulation of the Effect of Fractures Geometrical Properties, Reservoir and Operational Parameters, SPE 143434, 2011.
39.	Shahvar M.B., Kharrat R., N.,Badounak D., New Method of Generating Approximation Profile of Highly Noisy Wireline Logs Through Utilizing Wavelet Non-Parametric Regression, SPE 150788-MS, 2011.
40.	Tavakkoli M., Masihi M., Ghazanfari M. H., Kharrat R., Prediction of Asphaltene Precipitation During Solvent/CO2 Injection Conditions: A Comparative Study on Thermodynamic Micellization Model With a Different Characterization Approach and Solid Model, SPE 145638-PA, 2011.
41.	Fatemi S.M.; Kharrat R., Vossoughi S.: Investigation of Top –Down in situ combustion process complex fractured carbonate models: effect of fracture' geometrical properties SPE 149314, 2011.
42.	Ghoodjani, E., Kharrat, R., Vossoughi, M., Bolouri, S. H., A Review on Thermal Enhanced Heavy Oil Recovery from Fractured Carbonate Reservoirs, SPE 150147-MS- 2012.
43.	Farzaneh, S., Dehghan, A., Ghazanfari, M. H., Kharrat, R., A Comparative Study on WAS, SWAS, and Solvent-Soak Scenarios Applied to Heavy-Oil Reservoirs Using Five-Spot Glass Micromodels SPE 158376- 2012. 
44.	Kharrat, R., Zargar, Z., Razavi, S. M., Asphaltene Deposition Study and its Effects on Permeability Reduction - A Case Study, SPE 153512-MS- 2012.
45.	 Fatemi, S. M., Kharrat, R., Vossoughi, S., Ghotbi, C., Macroscopic Recovery Mechanisms of In-Situ Combustion Process in Heavy Oil Fractured Systems: Effect of Fractures Geometrical Properties and Operational Parameters, SPE 154839-MS- 2012. 
46.	Kharrat, R., Mahdavi S., Ghorbani D., A Comprehensive EOR Study of a Highly Fractured matured field- Case Study, SPE 153311, 2012.
47.	Khalifeh, M., Mahdavi, S., Khederzadeh, M., Kharrat, R., Ostadrezaei, S., Bagherzadeh, H., Investigation of Effective Mechanisms in Permeability Reduction Due to Asphaltene Deposition through Porous Media, SPE 165197-MS, 2013. 
48.	Izadi, M., Khalifeh, M., Bagherzadeh, H., Kharrat, R., an Experimental and Simulation Study of Asphaltene-Induced Permeability Impairment under Natural Depletion Condition, SPE 165196-MS, 2013.

National journals
1.	Kharrat, R., Jamialahmadi, M., and Vossoughi, S.: Rheological Properties of the Gel Systems Used in Petroleum Reservoir, Journal of the Iranian Polymer Science and Technology, Vol. 2, 1993, pp. 96–102.
2.	Pooladi, D. and Kharrat, R.: Heavy Oil Recovery Using Steam Injection and its Application for Fractured Reservoirs, Journal of Iranian Petroleum Institute, No. 34, 1993, pp. 6–14.
3.	Kharrat R. Vossoughi S.: Numerical Simulation of Viscoelastic Fluid Flow Past a Cylinder, J. Scientica Iranica, International Journal of Science and Technology, Vol. 1, No. 3, 1994, pp. 205–218.
4.	Kharrat R. and Babaki E.: Effect of Polymer on the Rheological and Physical Properties of Drilling Mud, Proceeding of the International Seminar on Polymer Science and Technology, Vol. 2, 1997, pp. 391–394.
5.	Salarieh, M., Kharrat, R. and Vossoughi S.: Development and Application of SAGD Theory in Fractured Reservoir, Tahghigh, Vol. 9, No. 32, 1999, pp. 9–18.
6.	Salarieh, M., and Kharrat, R.: Study of Biopolymers Effects on Pseudo-Plastic Behavior of Drilling Mud, Tahghigh, Vol. 9, No. 31, 1999, pp. 10–20.
7.	Salarieh, M., and Kharrat, R.: Effect of Major Salts Present in Ahwaz Water on the XC-Polymer Performance on the Pseudo-Plastic Behavior of Drilling Mud, Tahghigh, Vol. 9, No. 33, 1999, pp. 20–25. 
8.	Pedram, B. and Kharrat, R.: Computer Simulation of Heat Pump Application in Distillation Towers, Journal of Energy, Vol. 4, No. 8, 2000, pp. 40–54.
9.	Salarieh, M. and Kharrat, R.: Effect of Drispac Polymer on the Rheological Behavior of Drilling Mud, Journal of the Iranian Polymer Science and Technology, Vol. 13, 2000, pp. 83–88.
10.	Azin R., Kharrat R., Heavy oil: the important energy resource for the 21st century, ICE Journal, Vol.  4, No. 15, 2005.
11.	Azin R., Kharrat R., Upgrading and Refining of Heavy Oil, ICE Journal, Vol. 4, No. 16, 2005.
12.	Hemmati M. N., Kharrat R., Evaluation of Empirically Derived PVT Properties for Middle East Crude Oils, J. Scientica Iranica, International Journal of Science and Technology, August 2007.
13.	Azin R., Kharrat R., Vossoughi S., S. Ghotbi, Rostami B., Investigation of the VAPEX Performance in High Pressure Oil Reservoirs, NSMSI, Vol. 26, No. 3, 2007.
14.	Azin R., Kharrat R., Ghotbi C., Vossoughi S., Effect of Fracture Spacing in VAPEX Performance in Heavy Oil Fractured System, Iran. J. Chem. & Chem. Eng. Vol. 27, No. 1, Spring 2008.
15.	Azin R., Kharrat R., Rostami B., Vossoughi S., Theoretical Investigation of the VAPEX Process in Fractured Heavy Oil System at Reservoir Conditions,  Journal of Petroleum Science and Engineering, 2008, 60(1), pp 51–66.
16.	Kharrat R., S.M. Razavi," Determination of Reservoir Model from Well Test Data, Using an Artificial Neural Network, Scienta Iranica, Vol 15, No. 4, pp 487–493., 2008.
17.	Razzaghi S., Kharrat R., Rachtchian D., Vossoughi S., Saraji S., Investigation of Auto Ignition Condition Under Different Parameters, Iran. J. Chem. & Chem. Eng. 2008.
18.	Behrouz T. Kharrat R. and M.H. Ghazanfari, Experimental study of miscible injection process to crude oil using glass micro model, Iran. J. Chem. & Chem. Eng., 2008.
19.	Mahdavi S., Kharrat R.: Asphaltene Precipitation Prediction Using Micellization Model Based on Experimental Data, Accepted in J. petroleum science and technology.
20.	Mahdavi S., Kharrat R.: Thermodynamic Modeling of Asphaltene Precipitation in South Iranian Oil Reservoir, published in J. Technical & Professional of exploration & Production, 60 (2009).
21.	Delalat M.m and Kharrat R., Investigating the Effects of Heterogeneity, Injection rate, and Water Influx on GAGD EOR in Naturally Fractured Reservoir, Journal of Oil & Gas Science and Technology, Vol. 2, Issue 1, 2013, pp. 9–21.
22.	Khalili M., Kharrat R., Salahshour K.m Haghighat Sefat M., Fluid injection Optimization Using Modified Globel Dynamic Harmony Search, Journal of Oil & Gas Science and Technology, Vol. 2, Issue 3, 2013, pp. 57–72.
23.	Azadgoleh J. E., Kharrat R.,  Barati N., Sobhani A.,Stability of Silica Nanoparticle Dispersion in Brine Solution: An Experimental Study, Journal of Oil & Gas Science and Technology, Vol. 3, Issue 4, 2014, pp. 26–40.
24.	Haghi A.H., Kharrat R., Assef M.R., New interpretation of tension estimation in hydrocarbon reservoir based on acid frac data, Engineering Geology J., Vol 9, No. 2, summer 2014, pp. 2816–2789.
25.	Mohammadi M., Kharrat R., Hashemi A., Developing a Fuzzy Logic Model to Predict Asphaltene Precipitation during Natural Depletion based on Experimental Data, Journal of Oil & Gas Science and Technology, Vol. 4, Issue 2, 2015, pp. 40–49.
26.	Fallahnejad G., Kharrat R., Asphaltene deposition modeling during natural depletion and developing a new method for multiphase flash calculation, Iranian Journal of Oil & Gas Science and Technology, Volume 5, Issue 2, 2016, pp. 45–651-44.
27.	Ahmadi Y., Hassanbeygi M., Kharrat R., The Effect of Temperature and Injection Rate during Water Flood Using Carbonate Core Samples: An Experimental approach, Journal of Oil & Gas Science and Technology, Vol. 5, Issue 4, 2016, pp. 18–24.

International and national seminars & symposia
1.	Vossoughi, S. and Kharrat R.: Prediction of Fuel Deposition for the In-Situ Combustion Process by the Combined TGA/DSC/GC Techniques, Proc. Of the 12th North American Thermal Analysis Society (NATAS) /38th Calorimetry Conference, Williamsburg, Virginia, 1983, pp. 271–277. 
2.	Kharrat, R. and Vossoughi S.: Simulation of Viscoelastic Fluid Flow Past a Cylinder Using the Method of Line, Third European Rheology Conference, Edited by D.R. Oliver, Elsevier Applied Science Publisher, 1990, pp. 268–270.
3.	Kharrat, R. and Vossoughi S.: Rheological Characterization of Boger Fluids, Presented at the 62nd Annual Meeting of the Society of Rheology, New Mexico, U.S.A., Oct. 21-25, 1990.
4.	Kharrat, R.: Numerical Solution of Viscoelastic Fluid Flow Equations Over a Cylinder, Presented at the First International Conference on Applied Mathematics, Tehran-Iran, June 1991.
5.	Kharrat, R.: and Vossoughi S.: On the Simulation of Viscoelastic Fluid Past a Cylinder, Presented at the 63rd Annual Meeting of the Society of Rheology, Rochester, N.Y., Oct. 20-24, 1991.
6.	Kharrat, R. and Vossoughi S.: Rheological Behavior of the Gel Systems Used in Enhanced Oil Recovery, Theoretical and Applied Rheology, Vol. 1, Edited by P. Moldenaers and R. Kenning, Elsevier Science Publishers, 1992, p. 478-480.
7.	Kharrat, R. and Vossoughi S.: Comparison Between the Rheological Behavior of Boger Fluid and Jel Systems, Presented at the 64th Annual Meeting of the Society of Rheology, Pasadena California, Oct. 20-24, 1992.
8.	Kharrat, R., Jamialahmadi, M., Pooladi, D. and Vossoughi, S.: Moving Boundary Heat Conduction in Porous Media Accompanied with Fluid Flow, Transport Phenomena in Thermal Engineering, Edited by J.S. Lee, S.H. Chung, and K.H. Kim, Vol. 1, 1993, pp. 721–724.
9.	Jamialahmadi, M., Najibi, H., Kharrat, R., and Muller Steinhagen, H.: Pressure and Temperature Gradient Along a Two-Phase Flow-Line: Evaluation of Field Da ta, Transport Phenomena in Thermal Engineering, Edited by J.S. Lee, S.H. Chung, and K.H. Kim, 1993, pp. 536–539.
10.	Kharrat, R., Salarieh, M. and Jamialahmadi, M.: Experimental Investigation of Gravity Drainage by Steam Injection in Fractured Reservoirs, First International Congress of Chemistry and Chemical Engineering, 1–3 September 1993.
11.	Kharrat, R., Jamialahmadi, M. and Muller Steinhagen, H.: The Investigation of Oil Displacement by Enriched Gases, Proceeding of CHEMECA Conference, 1994, Melbourne, Australia.

12.	Kharrat, R. and Vossoughi S.: Application of Polymer in Petroleum Industry- An Overview, Proceeding of the International Seminar of Polymer Science and Technology, Vol. I, 1994, pp. 969–877.
13.	Kharrat R. and Salarieh, M.: Effect of Polymer addition on the Rheological properties of Drilling Mud, Proceeding of the First National Iranian Chemical Engineering Congress, 1995, pp. 315–321.
14.	Kharrat, R., Hamid, J. and Vossoughi S.: Development of a Fully Implicit Two Dimensional in-Situ Combustion Simulation Model, Transport Phenomena in Thermal-Fluids Engineering, Vol. 1, 1996, pp. 238–243.
15.	Salarieh, M., Kharrat, R. and Vossoughi S.: Heavy Oil Deposits in Southern Region of Iran and Steam Assisted Gravity Drainage as a Recovery Technique, Transport Phenomena in Thermal-Fluids Engineering, Vol. 2, 1996, pp. 1134–1139.
16.	Kharrat, R. and Vossoughi S.: Rheological Behavior of Drilling Fluids in the presence of Polymer as Additives, Proc. Of the XII International Congress on Rheology, 1996, pp. 480.
17.	Masihi, M., Torabi, M., Kharrat R., and Shadezadeh R.: Mathematical Simulation of Abadan Petrochemical Reactor, Presented at the 7th Petrochemical, Gas and Petroleum Congress, 1996, Tehran, Iran.
18.	Peramon, I. And Kharrat R.: The Prediction of Lean Gas Minimum Miscibility Pressure and Effect of CO2 on it for an Iranian Oil Reservoir, Proceeding of the 2nd National Iranian Chemical Engineering Congress, Vol. 2, 1997, pp. 613–616.
19.	Kharrat R. and Javadpour, F.: Development of Mathematical Models for Spare Matrices in Chemical & Petroleum Engineering, Proceeding of the 2nd National Iranian Chemical Engineering Congress, Vol. 1, 1997, pp. 135–138.
20.	Kharrat R. and Babaki I.: Effect of Kelzan XC Polymer on the properties of Drilling Mud, Proceeding of the 2nd National Iranian Chemical Engineering Congress, Vol. 1, 1997, pp. 580–583.
21.	Zehtaban, A. and Kharrat R.: Development of a computer Method for the Prediction of Ternary Phase Diagram, Proceeding of the 2nd National Iranian Chemical Engineering Congress, Vol. 1, 1997, pp. 419–422.
22.	Salarieh, M. and Kharrat R.: Effect of Salt Present in Ahwaz water on the Performance of X-100 Polymer on the Bingham Plastic Behavior of Drilling Mud, Presented the 8th Gas, Petroleum and Petrochemical Congress, Tehran, 1997.
23.	Kharrat R.: Effect of Salt on the Physical and Rheological Properties of Drilling Mud, Presented at the Second International Congress of Chemistry and Chemical Engineering, Kerman, 1997.
24.	Salarieh, M. and Kharrat, R.: Effect of Salt Present in Ahwaz Water on the Pseudoplastic Behavior of Drilling Mud, Proceeding of the 3rd National Chemical Engineering Congress, Vol. 1, 1998, pp. 33–35.
25.	Kharrat, R., Afkhami, F. and Dinarvand N.: Experimental Study of the Effect of Salt And Bentinite Type on the Behavior of Drilling Mud, Proceeding of the 3rd National Chemical Engineering Congress, Vol. 1, 1998, pp. 36–43.
26.	Massihi, M., Kharrat R., and Torabi, M.: The Evaluation and Simulation of Abadan Petrochemical PVC Reactor, Proceeding of the 3rd National Chemical Engineering Congress, Vol. 1, 1998, pp. 450–456.
27.	Pedram, B., and Kharrat, R.: New Method for the Solution of Spare Matrix in Chemical & Petroleum Engineering, Proceeding of the 3rd National Chemical Engineering Congress, Vol. 2, 1998, pp. 818–822.
28.	Mohebbi, N., Badakhshan A., and Kharrat, R.: Giant Oil Field Formation Water and Prediction of Their Related Scaling Problem, Paper 98-17, Presented at the 49th CIM, 1998, Calgary, Canada.
29.	Ghorbani, D. and Kharrat, R.: Field Problems and Performance of Directional Wells in Iranian Fractured Carbonate Reservoirs, Proceeding of the 2nd INRESC, 1998, pp. 570–680.
30.	Kharrat, R., Ahmadi M., and Honarmand A.: Application of Heat Pumps in Distillation and Comparison of Cost and Energy with Respect to Conventional Distillation, Proceeding of the 2nd INRESC, 1998, pp. 376–381.
31.	Mohebbi, N., Badakhshan A., and Kharrat, R.: Iranian Oil Field Formation Water and Prediction of Their Related Scaling Problem, Proceeding of the 2nd INRESC, 1998, pp. 85–110.
32.	Solaymani, P., and Kharrat, R.: Mathematical Modeling of Supercritical CO2 of Eucalyptus Oil, Proceeding of the 4th National Chemical Engineering Congress, Vol. 2, 1998, pp. 42–52.
33.	Massihi, M and Kharrat, R.: Optimization of Oil Production Operation by Winterizing Design, Proceeding of the 4th National Chemical Engineering Congress, Vol. 1, 1998, pp. 189–194.
34.	Aboda, K., Kharrat, R.  And Khorasha, F.: Modeling and simulation of EDC Production Rector of Abadan Petrochemical Plant, Proceeding of the 4th National Chemical Engineering Congress, Vol. 1, 1998, pp. 517–522. 
35.	Pedram, B. and Kharrat, R.: Computer Simulation of Heat Pump Application in Distillation Towers, Proceeding of the 4th National Chemical Engineering Congress, Vol. 2, 1998, pp. 97–103.
36.	Ghanizadeh, S. and Kharrat, R.: Modification Reddlich-Kwong Equation of State for the prediction of Hydrocarbon Fluid Properties, Proceeding of the 4th National Chemical Engineering Congress, Vol. 2, 1998, pp. 323–335.
37.	Ghanizadeh, S. and Kharrat, R.: The Computation of Vapor Pressure Using EOS Near Critical Points, Proceeding of the 4th National Chemical Engineering Congress, Vol. 2, 1998, pp. 479–484.
38.	Kharrat, R. Afkhami F.: Experimental Study of the Application of Malas and the Effect of Salt on the Rheological & Physical Properties of Drilling Fluids, Proceeding of the 4th National Chemical Engineering Congress, Vol. 4, 1998, pp. 38–42.
39.	Tahmasibi, H., Jamialahmadi, M., and Kharrat, R.: The Investigation of Scaling in Porous Media, Proceeding of the 4th National Chemical Engineering Congress, Vol. 1, 1998, pp. 60–64.
40.	Daliri, K. and Kharrat, R.: Experimental Study of Ethyl Benzene Separation From C7 Cut of Ark Petrochemical Plant, Abstract Summary of the 13th Iranian Chemistry and Chemical Engineering Congress, Paper No. 323, 1999, pp. 331.
41.	Solaymani, P. and Kharrat, R.: Extraction of Peppermint Oil of Okalptus Using Supercritical CO2 AND the characterization of its Components, Abstract Summary of the 13th Iranian Chemistry and Chemical Engineering Congress, Paper No. 140, 1999, pp. 348.
42.	Salarieh, M., and Kharrat, R.: Study of Biopolymers Effects on Pseudo-Plastic Behavior of Drilling Mud, Tahghigh, Vol. 9, No. 31, 1999, pp. 10–20.
43.	Kharrat, R.: Prospect of Thermal Recovery Method for Iranian Heavy Oil Deposits, Presented at the 5th National and the 4th International Chemical Engineering Congress, Shiraz-Iran, April 24–27, 2000.
44.	Soltani, A., Kharrat, R. and Dinarvand N.: Design and Construction of Drilling Circulation System for the Comprehensive study of Drilling Fluids, Presented at the 5th National and the 4th International Chemical Engineering Congress, Shiraz-Iran, April 24–27, 2000.
45.	Mehrmand, N. and Kharrat, R.: Effect of New Additives Produced from Malas on the Rheological Properties of Drilling Fluids, Presented at the 5th National and the 4th International Chemical Engineering Congress, Shiraz-Iran, April 24–27, 2000.
46.	Zarinabadi, S. and Kharrat, R.: Modeling of the Rate of Fouling in Razi Petrochemical Plant, Presented at the 5th National and the 4th International Chemical Engineering Congress, Shiraz-Iran, April 24–27, 2000.
47.	Hafizian, A. and Kharrat, R.: Measurement of the Solubility of 1-8 Seniual in Super Critical Carbon Dioxide, Presented at the 5th National and the 4th International Chemical Engineering Congress, Shiraz-Iran, April 24–27, 2000.
48.	Hafizian, A. and Kharrat, R.: Optimization of Okalptus Oil Extraction Using Supercritical CO2, Presented at the 5th National and the 4th International Chemical Engineering Congress, Shiraz-Iran, April 24–27, 2000.
49.	Hafizian, A. and Kharrat, R.: Optimization of Pharmaceutical Oil Extraction Using Supercritical Fluid, Presented at the 5th National and the 4th International Chemical Engineering Congress, Shiraz-Iran, April 24–27, 2000.
50.	Sam, B, and Kharrat, R.: Mathematical Modeling of Condenser-Cooler system of Ammonia Plant of Razi Petrochemical Plant, Presented at the 5th National and the 4th International Chemical Engineering Congress, Shiraz-Iran, April 24–27, 2000.
51.	Sam, B, and Kharrat, R.: Simulation of Heat Exchanger Network of Ammonia Unit of Razi Petrochemical Plant, Presented at the 5th National and the 4th International Chemical Engineering Congress, Shiraz-Iran, April 24–27, 2000.
52.	Zarie, A., Kharrat, R. Afkhami F.: Experimental Study of the Application of Malas and the Effect of Salt on the Rheological & Physical Properties of Drilling Fluids, Presented at the 5th National and the 4th International Chemical Engineering Congress, Shiraz-Iran, April 24–27, 2000.
53.	Kharrat, R., Afkhami F., and Zarei, A.: Introduction of New Malas by Product as New Additive and the Investigation of its Effect on the Properties of Water Based Mud, Presented at the 5th National and the 4th International Chemical Engineering Congress, Shiraz-Iran, April 24–27, 2000.
54.	Davoodi, M. and Kharrat, R.: Optimization of Field Operation Parameters of T.E.G. Units, Presented at the 5th National and the 4th International Chemical Engineering Congress, Shiraz-Iran, April 24–27, 2000.
55.	Mansouri, A. and Kharrat, R.: The Investigation of Coke Deposition Mechanisms inside Wall Tubes Cracking Reactor, Presented at the 5th National and the 4th International Chemical Engineering Congress, Shiraz-Iran, April 24–27, 2000.
56.	Tahmasibi, H., Jamialahmadi, M., and Kharrat, R.: Prediction of Calcium, Barium and Sulfate Scale Formation in Iranian off Shore Sirri Field, Presented at the 5th National and the 4th International Chemical Engineering Congress, Shiraz-Iran, April 24–27, 2000.
57.	Mansouri, A. and Kharrat, R.: Corrosion Investigation of Tubing Cracking Reactors of Ethane Unit of Bandar Imam Petrochemical plant, Presented at the First Corrosion Congress in Petroleum Industry, Tehran-Iran, June 12–14, 2000.
58.	Fighi, Sh. and Kharrat, R.: Mathematical Modeling of Supercritical CO2 of Essence Oil based on Extraction Concept, Presented at the 5th National and the 5th International Chemical Engineering Congress, Isfahan-Iran, April 24–27, 2001.
59.	Fighi, Sh. and Kharrat, R.: Mixing Rules of Wander Valas EOS and its Application for Supercritical Extraction Modeling, Presented at the 5th National and the 5th International Chemical Engineering Congress, Isfahan-Iran, April 24–27, 2001.
60.	Shojai Gh. and Kharrat, R.: Experimental and Mathematical Modeling of Mint Essence using EOS, Presented at the 5th National and the 5th International Chemical Engineering Congress, Isfahan-Iran, April 24–27, 2001.
61.	Shojai GH. and Kharrat, R.: experimental & Mathematical Modeling of Supercritical CO2 of Mint Essence Oil based on Solubility Concept, Presented at the 5th National and the 5th International Chemical Engineering Congress, Isfahan-Iran, April 24–27, 2001.
62.	Ghorbani, D. and Kharrat, R.: Fluid Characterization of an Iranian Carbonate Oil Reservoir Using Different PVT Packages, SPE 68745, Proceedings of the International Symposium on Oilfield Chemistry, Jakarta, Indonesia, 17–19 April 2001.
63.	Vafaie S., Kharrat, R, Amin Shahidi: Experimental investigation on Naturally Filter Cake heavy Oil Removal, Proceeding of the 8th National Chemical Engineering Congress, 2003.
64.	Taheri S., Kharrat R., Ghazanfari M. H., Khodabakhsh M.,  Experimental Investigation of the WAG process using CMG, presented at the 10th National Iranian Chemical Engineering Congress, Zahedan,  2005. 
65.	Ghazanfari M. H., Khodabakhsh M., Rashtchian D., Kharrat R., Enhancement of Gravity for two phase flow in Micro model system, presented at the 10th National Iranian Chemical Engineering Congress, Zahedan, 2005.
66.	Ghazanfari M. H., Khodabakhsh M, Haydari M., Zayni A., Etminan S. R., Kharrat R.,  Rashtchian D., Estimation of Relative Permeability of two Phase flow for unsteady state process using Micro model, presented at the 10th National Iranian Chemical Engineering Congress, Zahedan,  2005.
67.	Azin R., Kharrat R., Rostami B., Effect of Solubility and Diffusivity of Solvent in Heavy Oil on the Performance of the VAPEX Process as an Enhance Oil Recovery Process, presented at the 10th National Iranian Chemical Engineering Congress, Zahedan, 2005.
68.	Marzbanfard E., Kharrat R., Azin R., Experimental Study of the VAPEX Process for Fractured Reservoir, presented at the 10th National Iranian Chemical Engineering Congress, Zahedan, 2005.
69.	Haydari M, Jahromi A. Z., Kharrat R., Investigation of the Reduction Production Problems for an Iranian Oil Reservoir and Methods of Remedy through Reservoir Simulation, presented at the 10th National Iranian Chemical Engineering Congress, Zahedan, 2005. 
70.	Ghazanfari M. H., Khodabakhsh M., Kharrat R., Rashtchian D., Vossoughi S., Unsteady State Relative Permeability and Capillary Pressure Estimation of Porous Media, Presented at the XVI Internal Conference on Computational Methods in Water Resources, Copenhagen, Denmark, 2006.
71.	Ghazanfari M. H., Kharrat R., Capillary pressure estimation of porous media using statistical pore size function, to be presented at the 17th international congress of chemical and process engineering CHISA 2006, Czech Republic.
72.	Ghazanfari M. H., Kharrat R., Experimental and computer based simulation study of WAG process, to be presented at the 17th international congress of chemical and process engineering CHISA 2006, Czech Republic.
73.	Behrouz T., Kharrat R., Ghazanfari M. H., Experimental Investigation of Miscible Injection using Micro model, presented at the 11th National Iranian Chemical Engineering Congress, Tehran, Nov. 2006.
74.	Hosseini S. J., Kharrat R., Ghazanfari M. H., Experimental Study of Polymer injection in a Homogenous Environment Using Micro model, presented at the 11th National Iranian Chemical Engineering Congress, Tehran, Nov. 2006.
75.	Javadian H., Kharrat R., Ghazanfari H., Experimental Study of Water & Polymer Injection in Fractured Porous Media Using Micro Model, presented at the 11th National Iranian Chemical Engineering Congress, Tehran, Nov. 2006.
76.	Azin R., Kharrat R., Ghotbi C., S. Vossoughi, Role of Fracture Network on the VAPEX Process in Low Permeability Heavy Oil Systems, presented at the 11th National Iranian Chemical Engineering Congress, Tehran, Nov. 2006.
78.	Etminan S R, Maini  B. B., Kharrat R., The Role of Connate Water Saturation in VAPEX Process, paper  2007-005, Petroleum Society's 8th Canadian International Petroleum Conference, Calgary, Alberta, Canada, June 12–14, 2007. 
79.	Behrouz, T., Kharrat, R, Ghazanfari, M.H.: Experimental study of factors affecting heavy oil recovery in solvent floods, paper 2007-006   Canadian International Petroleum Conference (CIPC) 2007, Calgary, Alberta, Canada.
80.	Ghazanfari, M.H., Rashtchian D., Kharrat R., Vossoughi S., Rezaeipour R., "Solute dispersion in  flow through saturated porous media", 5th International Congress on Chemical Engineering, Kish, Iran, 2008.
81.	Tavakkoli M., Kharrat R. and Ghazanfari M.H." Experimental-based numerical study of two phase flow through porous media: comparison of finite element and finite difference schemes", 5th International Congress on Chemical Engineering, Kish, Iran, 2008.
82.	Azin R., Kharrat R., Rostami B., Vossoughi S., Theoretical Investigation of the VAPEX Process in Fractured Heavy Oil System at Reservoir Conditions,  Journal of Petroleum Science and Engineering, 2008, 60(1), pp 51–66.
83.	Rafeei M., Kharrat R. and Ghazanfari M.H., " Effect of Fracture Geometrical Properties on Oil Recovery by Polymer Flooding: an Experimental Approach", 5th International Congress on Chemical Engineering, Kish, Iran, 2008.
84.	Rezaeipour A.R., Kharrat R., and M.H. Ghazanfari, "Dispersion of Solvent in Crude oil Saturated Porous Media", 5th International Congress on Chemical Engineering, Kish, Iran, 2008.
85.	Farzaneh A., Kharrat R. and Ghazanfari M.H., " Experimental study of solvent flooding to heavy oil in fractured 5-Spot models: fracture geometrical characteristics effects", 5th International Congress on Chemical Engineering, Kish, Iran, 2008.
86.	Jahanshahi E., Salahshoor K., Kharrat R., Modeling and Simulation of Instabilities in Gas-Lifted Oil Wells, SPE 112108, Presented at the 2008 North Africa Technical Conference And Exhibition in Morocco, 2008.

87.	Rahnema H., Kharrat R., Rostami B., Experimental and Numerical Study of Vapor Extraction Process (VAPEX) in Heavy Oil Fractured Reservoir, paper 2008-116, Canadian International Petroleum Conference/SPE Gas Technology Symposium 2008 Joint Conference (the Petroleum Society's 59th Annual Technical Meeting), Calgary, Alberta, Canada, 17–19 June 2008.
88.	Kharrat R., Ghaderi, S.M., Rahnema, M., and Ghazanfari M.H., " Measurement of CO2 diffusivity in bitumen saturated sands: A new mathematical modeling approach", World Heavy Oil Conference, World Heavy Oil Congress, 10–12 March, Edmonton, Canada, 2008.
89.	Razzaghi S., Kharrat, R., Rashtchian D. and Vossoughi S. "Design of In-Situ Combustion Process by Using Experimental Data", World Heavy Oil Conference, WHOC, 10–12 March, Edmonton, Canada, 2008.
90.	Farzaneh A., Kharrat R. and Ghazanfari M.H.," Experimental investigation of miscible two phase flow displacement in fractured and non-fractured glass micro models", Will be presented at Proceedings of the Sixth International ASME Conference on Nana channels, Micro channels and Min channels, ICNMM2008, June 23–25, 2008, Darmstadt, Germany.
91.	Jahanshahi E., Salahshoor K., Kharrat R., Online LQC Stabilization of Unstable Gas-Lift oil Wells, presented at 18th European Symposium on Computer Aided Process Engineering, Italy, 2008.
92.	Jahanshahi E., Salahshoor K., Kharrat R., Predicting Void Wave Instability in Gas-Lifted Wells, presented at IEEE Conference, France, 2008.
93.	Taheri, S., Kharrat, R, Ghazanfari1, M. H., Vossoughi S., "Experimental Investigation and Computer Modeling of WAG Process in a High Pressure Glass Micromodel Porous Medium", 18th International Congress of Chemical and Processing Engineering, Prague, Czech Republic, 2008. 
96.	Zarinabadi S., Kharrat R., Empirical Method to Predict Solubility in Supercritical Fluid, 18th International Congress of Chemical and Processing Engineering, Prague, Czech Republic, 2008.
97.	Zarinabadi S., Kharrat R. Supercritical Extraction Modeling on Plant Oil Based a Yield of Extraction, 18th International Congress of Chemical and Processing Engineering, Prague, Czech Republic, 2008. 
98.	Rostami B., Kharrat R., Ghotbi S, Pooladi D. F.,  Influence of displacement rate on two phase gas/oil relative permeability's, SCA International Symposium, Abu Dhabi, 2008.
99.	Rostami B. Kharrat R., Ghotbi S, Pooladi D. M, Alipour A., Role of Wettability on oil recovery during forced gravity drainage on subsequent water flood, 10th Wettability Conference, Abu Dhabi, 2008.
100.	Farzaneh, S. A., Kharrat, R., Ghazanfari, M. H.," Comparative study of IOR Scenarios Applied to Heavy Oil reservoirs: WAS, SWAS and Solvent-soak", to be presented in the 12th National Iranian Chemical Engineering Congress, Tabriz, 2008.
101.	Farzaneh, S. A., Kharrat, R., Ghazanfari, M. H.," Experimental and Simulation Study of Solvent Injection to Heavy Oil Fractured Reservoirs", to be presented in the 12th National Iranian Chemical Engineering Congress, Tabriz, 2008.

102.	Farzaneh, S.A., Kharrat, R., Ghazanfari, M.: Experimental study of solvent flooding to heavy oil fractured five-spot micro-models: the role of fracture geometrical characteristics, paper 208-108, Canadian International Petroleum Conference (CIPC) 2008, Calgary, Alberta, Canada.
103.	Feali, M., Kharrat, R.: feasibility study of the cyclic VAPEX process for low permeable carbonate systems, IPTC 12833 MS, 2008.
104.	Haghi A. H., Asef M.R., Kharrat R., Estimation of In-Situ Stress by using Acid Fracturing in Oil Reservoir, 3rd World Stress Map Conference Frontiers of Stress Research: Observation, Integration and Application, German, 2008.
105.	Hamedi Shokrlu, Y., Kharrat R., Ghazanfari, M.H., Saraji, S., "Screening of Potential Asphaltene Deposition in Iranian Oil Reservoirs", to be presented in the 12th National Iranian Chemical Engineering Congress, Tabriz, 2008.
106.	Fatemi S.M., Kharrat R., Vossoughi S., 2008c, ″Feasibility Study of In-Situ Combustion (ISC) in 2D Laboratory Scale Fractured Systems Using a Thermal Reservoir Simulator″, presented at World Heavy Oil Congress, Paper 2008-449, Canada.
107.	Sardari, S., Kharrat, R., Ghazanfari, M.H., Saraji, S., "Modeling of permeability Reduction in Porous Media Due to Asphaltene Precipitation", to be presented in the 12th National Iranian Chemical Engineering Congress, Tabriz, 2008.
108.	Rostami B., Kharrat R., Ghotbi C. and Samani Sh., "Determination of Relative Permeability from Production Data in Forced Gravity Drainage" to be presented in the 12th National Iranian Chemical Engineering Congress, Tabriz, 2008.
109.	Derakhshanfar M., Kharrat R., and Rostami B., "Application of vapor extraction (Vapex) process in high pressure heavy oil reservoirs using mixed gases" to be presented in the 12th National Iranian Chemical Engineering Congress, Tabriz, 2008.
110.	Fatemi S., Kharrat R., Ghotbi C. and Badakhshan A." Injection well-producer well combination optimization for THAI technology in the case of Kuh-e-Mond carbonated reservoir" to be presented in the 12th National Iranian Chemical Engineering Congress, Tabriz, 2008.
111.	Alipour Tabrizy V., Kharrat R. and Rostami B., "The role of Wettability in Gas-Assisted Gravity Drainage Process" to be presented in the 12th National Iranian Chemical Engineering Congress, Tabriz, 2008.

112.	Mahdavi S., Hagparast S, Kharrat R., Experimental and Modeling Study of Asphaltene Precipitation in Petroleum Fluids, Proceedings of the fourth International Conference on Thermal Engineering: Theory and Applications, January 12–14, 2009, Abu Dabi, UAE.
113.	Dehghan A.A., Kharrat R., M.H. Ghazanfari, S. Vossoughi, Investigating the Effect of Co-Solvents on Heavy Oil Recovery in Different Pore Geometries Using Five-Spot Micromodels, 15th European Symposium on Improved Oil Recovery, Paris, France, 2009.
114.	Ghazanfari M.H., D. Rashtchian, Kharrat R., S. Vossoughi, A.R. Rezaeipour, Visualization and Quantification of Solute Dispersion in Saturated Porous Medium: The Role of Throat Orientation, presented  in Proceedings of  the Fourth International Conference on Thermal Engineering: Theory and Applications ICTEA Conference,  Abu Dhabi, UAE, Jan 2009.
115.	Dehghan A.A., Kharrat R., M. Ghazanfari, Displacement Visualization of Asphaltinic-Heavy Oil by Co-Solvents at Different Wettability Conditions, presented  in Proceedings of  the Fourth International Conference on Thermal Engineering: Theory and Applications ICTEA Conference,  Abu Dhabi, UAE, Jan 2009.
116.	Shahrokhi O., Kharrat R., M. Sedghi, M. Ghazanfari, S. Saraji, A New Universal Model for Predicting Asphaltene Precipitation in Crude Oil, presented  in Proceedings of  the Fourth International Conference on Thermal Engineering: Theory and Applications  ICTEA Conference,  Abu Dhabi, UAE, Jan 2009.
117.	Farzaneh S., A. Dehghan, Kharrat R., M. Ghazanfari, Influence of Discontinuous Shaly Structures on Heavy Oil Cold Production Efficiency during Hydrocarbon Solvents Injection: Experimental and Simulation Studies, presented  in Proceedings of  the Fourth International Conference on Thermal Engineering: Theory and Applications   ICTEA Conference,  Abu Dhabi, UAE, Jan 2009.
118.	Farzaneh S.A., A.A. Dehghan, Kharrat R., and M.H. Ghazanfari A Comparative Study of WAS, SWAS and Solvent-Soak Scenarios Applied to Heavy Oil Reservoirs Using 5-Spot Glass Micromodels, paper 2009-038, Canadian International Petroleum Conference (CIPC), Calgary, Alberta, Canada from 16–18 June 2009.
119.	Derakhshanfar M., Kharrat R., B. Rostami, S.R. Etminan, Effect of Mixed Gas Solvent Injection on Performance of the Vapex Process in an Iranian Heavy Oil Sample, paper 2009-094 presented in Canadian International Petroleum Conference (CIPC), Calgary, Alberta, Canada from 16–18 June 2009.
120.	Sadeqi Mogadam M., H. Firoozinia, Kharrat R., M.H. Ghazanfari, Alamatsaz, R.,   Effect of Pressure and CO2 Composition Changes on Distribution of Asphaltene Molecular Weight in Heavy Crude Oil, paper 2009-037, Canadian International Petroleum Conference (CIPC), Calgary, Alberta, Canada from 16–18 June 2009.
121.	Dehghan A.A., Farzaneh S.A., Kharrat R., M.H. Ghazanfari, The Role of Pore Geometry and Connate Water on Miscible Displacement of Heavy Oil With Hydrocarbon Solvents in Strongly Water-Wet and Oil-Wet Media Using Five-Spot Micromodels, paper 2009-091, Canadian International Petroleum Conference (CIPC), Calgary, Alberta, Canada from 16–18 June 2009.
122.	Tavakkoli M., Kharrat R., M. Massihi and M.H. Ghazanfari, Thermodynamic Modeling of Asphaltene Precipitation for Heavy Crude: A Comparative Study of Thermodynamic Micellization Model and Solid Model, paper 2009-090, Canadian International Petroleum Conference (CIPC) 2009, Calgary, Alberta, Canada, 16–18 June 2009.
123.	Dehghan, A.A., Farzaneh, S.A., Kharrat, R., Ghazanfari, M.: Experimental Study of the Effect of Barriers on Heavy Oil Recovery during Hydrocarbon Solvent Injections, 6th international chemical engineering congress & exhibition, 16-20 Nov. Kish, Iran, 2009.
124.	Fatemi, S.A., Kharrat, R.: Investigation of Fractures Geometrical Properties Effect on the Efficiency of Top-Down In-Situ Combustion Process in Fractured Carbonate Systems, 6th international chemical engineering congress & exhibition, 16-20 Nov. Kish, Iran, 2009.
125.	Sadeqi Moqadam, M., Firoozinia, H., Kharrat, R.,  Ghazanfari, M.: Monitoring of Asphaltene Molecular Weight Distribution at Different Conditions of Pressure and CO2 Injection, 6th international chemical engineering congress & exhibition, 16-20 Nov. Kish, Iran, 2009.
126.	Najafia, I., Kharrat, R., Ghotbi, C., Ghazanfari, M.: A Detailed Modeling for Enhanced Fluid Percolation in Fractured Porous Media by Application of Low_Frequency Elastic Waves: An Extension of Previous Models to Fractured Reservoirs, 6th international chemical engineering congress & exhibition, 16-20 Nov., Kish, Iran, 2009.
127.	Najafi, I., Kharrat, R., Ghotbi, C., Ghazanfari, M., Dehghan, A.A,: Ultrasonic Waves Effect on Removing Skin from Near Wellbore Region: A Modeling and Experimental Approach, 6th international chemical engineering congress & exhibition, 16-20 Nov. Kish, Iran, 2009.
128.	Farzaneh, S.A., Dehghan, A.A., Khani, M., Kharrat, R., Ghazanfari, M.: Parametric Investigation of WAG Injection Process in Naturally Fractured Reservoirs, 6th international chemical engineering congress & exhibition, 16-20 Nov. Kish, Iran, 2009.
129.	Nikpoor, M.H., Kharrat, R., Zhangxin, C.: Modeling of compositional grading and plus fraction properties changes with depth in petroleum reservoirs, accepted for publication in journal of petroleum science and technology, 2009.
130.	Fatemi S.M., Kharrat R., Vossoughi S., d, ″Simulation of the SAGD Process in a Laboratory-Scale Fractured Model″, World Heavy Oil Congress, Paper 2009-303, Venezuela, 2009.
131.	Dehghan A.A., R. Kharrat, M.H. Ghazanfari, Experimental Investigation of Wettability effect on Co-Solvent Flooding of Heavy Oil Reservoirs, 4th North African/Mediterranean Petroleum and Geosciences Conference & Exhibition, Tunisia, Tunis, March 2009.
132.	Tavakolli. M., Kharrat R., Massihi M., Ghazanfari M.H., Prediction of Asphaltene Precipitation Using Thermodynamic Micellization Model,  (ICheaP-9), Ninth International Conference on Chemical and Process Engineering, Rome, Italy, May 2009.
133.	Tavakolli M., R. Kharrat, M. Massihi M., M.H. Ghazanfari, Prediction of Asphaltene Precipitation During Gas Injection in Heavy Crude Using Micellization Model With A New Approach, 71st EAGE Conference & Exhibition, Netherlands, Amsterdam, June 2009.
134.	Mosavat N.I, Kharrat R., S.A. Farzaneh, M.H. Ghazanfari, Experimental and Theoretical Investigation of Inorganic Scale Deposition in Carbonated Micromodels,  Presented at, 7th International Conference on Nanochanneles Micro channels and Minichannels ( ICNMM2009), Pohang, South Korea, June 2009.
135.	Tavakkoli M., Kharrat R., M. Masihi, M.H. Ghazanfari and S. Fadaei, Phase Behavior Modeling of Asphaltene Precipitation for Heavy Crude, To be presented at 17th Symposium on Thermo physical Properties, Boulder, Colorado, U.S.A., 21–26 June 2009.
136.	Tavakkoli M., Kharrat R., M. Massihi and M.H. Ghazanfari, Thermodynamic Modeling of Petroleum Fluids Containing Asphaltene Aggregates: A Comparative Study of Thermodynamic Micellization Model and Solid Model, presented at 7th World Conference on Experimental Heat Transfer, Fluid Mechanics and Thermodynamics, Kraków, Poland, 28 June – 3 July 2009.
138.	Firoozinia H., Sadeqi Moqadam M., Kharrat R., M.H. Ghazanfari " Experimental and Modeling Study of Asphaltene Precipitation at Reservoir Conditions: The Effect of Pressure Changes ", Technical Conference of Thermodynamics, Iran University of Science and Technology, Tehran, Iran, 2009.
139.	Tavakkoli M., Kharrat R., M. Massihi and M.H. Ghazanfari, Phase Behavior Modeling of Asphaltene Precipitation Using An Improved Solid Model, Second Technical Conference of Thermodynamics, Iran University of Science and Technology,  Tehran, Iran, 2009.
140.	Mahmoodi Y., Kharrat R., A. Hashemi: Study of thermally assisted gas oil drainage in one of Iranian fractured reservoirs, presented at the EGEA 1st International petroleum conference, Shiraz Iran, 2009.
141.	Moradi B., Kharrat R.: Pressure-volume-temperature Correlations for Iranian Crude Oils, presented at the EGEA 1st International petroleum conference, Shiraz Iran, 2009.
142.	Fatemi S. M., Kharrat R., Ghotbi C.: Simulation Study of Conventional Fire Flooding (CFF) in Fractured Combustion Cells: A Promising Tool along Experiment, presented at the EGEA 1st International petroleum conference, Shiraz Iran, 2009.
143.	Moradi B., Kharrat R.: Oil Formation Volume Factor Correlation for Middle East Crude Oils, presented at the EGEA 1st International petroleum conference, Shiraz Iran, 2009.
144.	Shahvar, M.B., Kharrat, R., Mahdavi, R.: Incorporating Fuzzy logic artificial neural networks for building a hydraulic unit-based model for permeability prediction of a heterogeneous carbonate reservoir, IPTC 13732, 2009.
145.	Tavakkoli, M., Kharrat, R., Masihi, M., Ghazanfari. M.: Prediction of Asphaltene Precipitation under Gas Injection Condition Using Thermodynamic Micellization Model, 6th international chemical engineering congress & exhibition, 16-20 Nov. Kish, Iran, 2009.
146.	Fatemi S.M., Kharrat R., Ghotbi C., b, ″Simulation Study of Conventional Fire Flooding (CFF) in Fractured Combustion Cells: A Promising Tool along Experiment″, EAGE 1st International Petroleum Conference & Exhibition, Shiraz, Iran, 2009.
147.	Fatemi S.M., Kharrat R., Ghotbi C., c, ″Investigation of Fractures Geometrical Properties on Conventional Fire Flooding (CFF) Process Performance″, presented at EAGE Improved Oil Recovery Symposium, Paris, France, 2009.
148.	Bagheri M.B., Mirzabozorg A., Kharrat R., Dastkhan Z., Ghotbi C., Abedi J., Developing a new scaling equation for modeling asphaltene Precipitation, paper 2009-039, Canadian International Petroleum Conference (CIPC), Calgary, Alberta, Canada from 16–18 June 2009.
149.	Bagheri, M.B., Kharrat, R., Mirzabozora, A., Ghotbi, C., Dastkhan, Z.: A novel method to develop a new scaling equation for modeling of asphaltene precipitation, SPE 125567, Abudhabi 2009.
150.	Mirzabozorg, A., Kharrat. R, Bagheri, M.B., Ghotbi, C.: Simulation Study of Asphaltene Deposition Due to Natural Depletion in One of the Iranian Fractured Reservoirs, 6th international chemical engineering congress & exhibition, 16-20 Nov., Kish, Iran, 2009.

151.	Mahdavi S., Haqparast S., Kharrat R., Thermodynamic Modeling of Asphaltene Precipitation in Petroleum Fluid, presented in Second Technical Conference of Thermodynamics, Iran University of Science and Technology, Tehran, Iran, 2009.
152.	Mirzabozorg A., Bagheri M.B, Kharrat R., Abedi J., Ghotbi C., Simulation Study of Permeability Impairment Due to Asphaltene Deposition in One of the Iranian Oil Fractured Reservoirs, poster presentation, paper 2009-088, Canadian International Petroleum Conference (CIPC), Calgary, Alberta, Canada from 16–18 June 2009.
153.	Nasirahmadi, E., Kharrat, R., Ghazanfari, M., Rashtchian, D.: Experimental Study of Diffusivity for Hydrocarbon Solvents-Iranian Heavy Oil System, Annual International Conference on Mechanical Engineering-ISME 2010, 11–13 May 2010, Sharif University of Technology, Tehran, Iran.
154.	Nasirahmadi, E., Kharrat, R., Ghazanfari, M., Rashtchian, D.: Experimental Study of Diffusivity for Hydrocarbon solvents-Iranian Heavy Oil System, accepted for poster presentation in 1st Iranian upstream oil and gas congress, 2010. 
155.	 Shahvar, M., Kharrat, R.: A new approach to predict relative permeability by artificial networks using the concept of hydraulic units: case study of an Iranian carbonate reservoir, Poster presentation, 9th Middle east Geosciences Conference and exhibition, IGEO 2010.
156.	Shahvar, M., Kharrat, R.: An integrated model for characterizing heterogeneous carbonate reservoirs, Poster presentation, 9th Middle east Geosciences Conference and exhibition, IGEO 2010.
157.	Shahvar, M., Kharrat, R., Matin, M.: Role of artificial intelligence in different stages of an advanced petrophysical reservoir characterization process: case study of Iranian carbonate reservoirs, Poster presentation, 9th Middle east Geosciences Conference and exhibition, IGEO 2010.
158.	Naseryan Moghadam, J., Salahshoor, K., Kharrat, R.: Intelligent Prediction of Porosity and Permeability from Well Logs for One of the Iranian Fractured Carbonate Reservoirs, 2010.
159.	Bagheri, M.B, Kharrat, R., Ghotbi, C: Dynamic modeling and optimization of asphaltene deposition in reservoir rocks using genetic algorithm, EAGE Spain, Oral presentation, 2010.  
160.	Fatemi S.M.; Kharrat R.; Vossoughi S., ″Feasibility Study of Top-down In-Situ Combustion Process in Fractured Carbonate Reservoirs using Computer Simulation of the Laboratory-Scale Fractured Models″, 5th International Conference of Thermal Engineering, Marrakesh, Morocco, 2010.
161.	Heydarian A., Kharrat R.: The Impact of Sparkling Mechanism on Improving Oil Recovery Through Nano-Particle Injection- Experimental Study, The first international conference of oil, gas, petrochemical & power plant, Tehran, Iran, June 2012.
162.	Bahrami P., Kharrat R., Ghalangharan V., Mahdavi S.: The prospect of Asphaltene precipitation in some Iranian Reservoirs, presented at the 14th National Chemical Engineering Congress, Oct. 2012, Shari University, Tehran, Iran.
163.	Zaribafan E., Kharrat R., Ansari M.R., Geothermometery of hot springs in south and southwest of Iran in purpose of geothermal reservoirs temperature prediction as used in novel Geothermal EOR method, 3rt International Conference on oil, gas, and petrochemical, Dec, 2015, Tehran, Iran.
164.	Zaribafan E., Kharrat R., Ansari M.R., Application of renewable energy in EOR by two purposes of increasing oil and presenting a solution for decreasing environmental issues, 2nd International Conference on New Approaches in Sciences, Engineering & Technology, Nov. 2015, Istanbul  Turkey l.
165.	Kor P., Kharrat R., Ayyoubi A., Modeling and Parametric Analysis of the Rate of Asphaltene Particle Deposition from Oil Stream, 3rd Oil, Gas, and Petrochemical International Conference, Tehran, 2015.
166.	Kharrat R.: Nano Enhanced Oil Recovery, Asian Nano Forum Conference, March 2015, Kish Iran.

Theses completed
1.	Development of a New Criterion for a Feasibility Study of the In-Situ Combustion Process and its Implementation for Four Kansas Oil Reservoirs, M.S., University of Kansas, 1984.
2.	Rheological Characterization of Boger Fluid and its Numerical Solution over a Cylinder, Ph.D., University of Kansas, 1989.

PhD dissertations supervised
1.	Theoretical and Experimental study of the VAPEX process in fractured heavy oil systems, Azin R., 2007.
2.	Prediction of Multi-Phase Flow Properties in a MIXED-Wet Porous Medium Using Micromodel Experiments and Pore-Scale Modeling, M.H. Ghazanfari, 2008.
3.	Feasibility study of auto ignition on Kuh-e-Mond crude oil, Razzaghi, S., 2008.
4.	Mathematics studies of improved oil recover under forced gravity drainage GAGD process, Rostami B., 2009.
5.	Experimental and theoretical study of scale formation, Tahmasibi H., 2009. 
6.	Experimental study & mathematical modeling of Asphaltene deposition in porous media, Bagheri, M.B, 2010.
7.	Experimental study of VAPEX and no particle for fractured system, Pour Abdullah K., 2010.
8.	Extraction of oil from canola seeds with supercritical carbon dioxide: Experimental and Modeling, Zarenabadi S., 2011.
9.	Productive Optimization of Oil production through Water flooding, Elham Yesari, 2013
10.	Asphaltene Instability Trends to Predict Asphaltene Precipitation Onset Pressure; Constrained for Light and Heavy Crude Oils, Advisor, Samira Dolati 2014.
11.	Experimental modeling and modeling of Asphaltene Deposition in porous media due to gas injection, Afsaneh Raz, 2014.
12.	The application of stable nano micro emulsion fluids in the Enhanced Oil Recovery, Barati N, expected graduation, 2017.
13.	Theoretical and Experimental Investigation of Carbonated Smart Water Injection Mechanisms in EOR, Soleimani P., expected graduation 2018.

MSC theses supervised
1.	Improved Gravity Drainage by Steam Injection in Fractured Reservoirs, Mehran Pooladi Darvish, M.S., 1992.
2.	The Construction of Slim Tube Apparatus and its Application for Measuring the Minimum Miscibility Pressure (MMP), Jafar Sadegh Mogaddas, M.S., 1992.
3.	Development of a Fully Implicit two-dimensional In-Situ Combustion Model and its Application for Fractured Reservoir, Javad Hamid, M.S., 1992.
4.	Lab-E-Safid Simulation Study and Material Balance Model Improvement, Shokrollah Zadeh Behbahani, M.S., 1992.
5.	Permeability Reduction Due to Particle Movement in Porous Media- a Field Case Approach Siri Field, Koroush Asghari, M.S., 1993.
6.	Experimental Study of Gravity Drainage in Packed Beds with Fractures During Steam Injection, Salareh Majid, M.S., 1993.
7.	Reduction of Permeability due to Fine Particles Movement through Porous Media During Water Flooding, Hamid Roshanravan, M.S., 1993.
8.	The Study of Scaling Problem in Porous Media, Hamzeh Ali Tahmasebi, M.S., 1994.
9.	The Theoretical Prediction of Minimum Miscibility Pressure Using Equation of State, Jalal Harati, M.S., 1994.
10.	The Study & Simulation of PVC Reactor of Abadan Petrochemical Plant, Mohsen Massihi, 1995.
11.	The Application of a Single Sector Simulator for the Simulation of an Iranian Oil Reservoir, Farzad Hoosani Asl, M.S., 1996.
12.	Experimental Determination of IFT at Reservoir Conditions, Sohrabi S., M.S., 1996.
13.	Fares Reservoir Fluid Analysis, Gholam Reza Alizadeh Atar, M.S., 1997.
14.	The Prediction of Lean Gas Minimum Miscibility Pressure and Effect of CO2, N2 and H2S Impurities on it for Iranian Oil Reservoir, Ibrahim Peramon, M.S., 1997.
15.	Effects of Polymers (Kelzan XC and Driscal D LTO # 1056) on Rheological and Filtration Properties of Drilling Mud, Ismail Babaki, M.S., 1997.
16.	The Rheological Behavior of Drilling Mud at Real Field Conditions- Southern Region of Iran, Nasser Pour Ayoubi, M.S., 1998.
17.	The Modification of Ridlich- Kwong Equation of State for the prediction of Hydrocarbon Fluid Properties, Ghanizadeh S., M.S., 1998.
18.	Mathematical Modeling of the Extraction of Eucalyptus Oil by Supercritical CO2, Solaimani P., M.S., 1998.
19.	Mathematical Modeling & Simulation of Heat Pump in Distillation, Pedram P., M.S., 1999.
20.	Experimental Study of the Separation of Ethyl Benzene From C7+ of Arak Petrochemical Plant, Daleri K., M.S., 1999.
21.	Mathematical Modelling & Simulation of PVC Reactor of Abadan Petrochemical Plant, Shojai M., 1999.
22.	Modeling & Simulation of EDC Production Reactor of Abadan Petrochemical Plant, Aboda K., M.S., 1999.
23.	Effect of Malas Addition on The Physical & Rheological Properties of Drilling Mud, Merhmand N., M.S., 1999.
24.	Investigation of Asphaltene Formation and its Solubility for Iranian Oil Reservoirs, Ghoimani K., M.S. 1999.
25.	Comparison of PVT for Simulation Studies, Davood Gh, M.S., 1999.
26.	Experimental Determination of Pharmaceutical Oil (Mint, Hanna, Zera) Using Supercritical Fluid, Hafizian A., M.S., 1999.
27.	Simulation & Modeling of the Fouling Phenomena for the Heat Exchanger unit of Razi Petrochemical Plant, Zarinabadi S., M.S., 2000.
28.	Simulation of Heat Exchanger Network of Ammonia Unit of Razi Petrochemical Plant, Sam Bahram. M.S., 2000.
29.	Optimization of Field Operation Parameters of T.E.G. Dehydration Units of Ghajsaran region (Gas Compression), Davoodi S. A. M.S., 2000.
30.	The Investigation of Coke Deposition Mechanisms inside Wall Tubes Cracking Reactor of Bandar Imam Petrochemical Plant, Mansouri A., M.S., 2000.
31.	Experimental Study of the Application of Malas and the Effect of Salt on the Rheological & Physical Properties of Drilling Fluids, Zarie, A., M.S., 2000.
32.	Design and Construction of Drilling Circulation System for the Comprehensive study of Drilling Fluids, Soltani, A., M.S., 2000.
33.	Full Field Model Study of a Highly Fractured Low Carbonate Reservoir, Fathi A., M.S., 2000.
34.	Mathematical & experimental Modeling of the Extraction of Hanna by Supercritical CO2, Fighi Shahriyar. M.S., 2001.
35.	Experimental determination of the optimum parameters for the Extraction of Mint Oil by Supercritical CO2, Shojai Gh., M.S., 2001.
36.	The Modification of Ridlich- Kwong Equation of State for the prediction of Binary Hydrocarbon Fluid Properties, Mohtdi S., M.S., 2001.
37.	Multi Sector Simulation of one of Huge Iranian Reservoirs with “Eclips-100”, S. Roknee., 2001.
38.	 Enhanced Oil recovery in Reservoirs with Gas Cap by Nitrogen Injection, M. Memarzadeh., 2002.
39.	 Investigation & Determination of Producing Parameters in One of Iranian reservoirs & Their Effect on Neighboring Reservoirs., K. Hamid., 2002. 
40.	Reservoir Wettability Modeling of Iranian Reservoirs, K. Ghaedsareh., 2002. 
41.	Determination of Bit Toque in Pabdeh & Gorpi Based on One of Statistical Model, H. Tavakooli Boyary, 2003.
42.	Experimental Investigation of Rheological Properties of Cement Slurry in HPHT, G. Younisi, 2003.
43.	Prediction of Oil PVT Properties Using Artificial Neural Network Models, A. Nazairi, 2003.
44.	Drilling Optimization, M. Akbari, 2003.
45.	Study of Lost Circulation in Marun Oilfield and Investigation of Underbalance Drilling Applicability, M. Goje Hessari, 2004.
46.	PVT Properties and Viscosity Correlations for Iranian and Middle East Oils, M. N. Hemmati, 2005.
47.	Investigation of production problems and feasibility study of gas injection in an Iranian offshore oil reservoir, M. Massah, 2005.
48.	Water shutoff in naturally fractured reservoirs, R. Hashemi, 2005.
49.	Flow visualization & simulation studies of Gas injection process at reservoir condition, B. M. Varnamkhasti, 2005.
50.	Effect of Wettability on water flooding in naturally fractured reservoirs, A. Shahmohammad, 2005.
51.	Application of VAPEX process in high pressure fractured heavy oil reservoirs, B. Rostami, 2005.
52.	Pore network modeling of petrophysical parameters, P. Ahmadi, 2005.
53.	Feasibility study of in-situ combustion in naturally fractured heavy oil reservoirs, F. Tabasinejad, 2005.
54.	Investigation of Gas Cycling Process in Fractured Gas Condensate Reservoirs, Sh. Kamari, 2005.
55.	 Experimental study of VAPEX process for Heavy oil fractured reservoirs, E. Marzbanfard, 2006.
56.	The role of connate water saturation in VAPEX process, S.R. Etminan, 2006.
57.	Experimental study and sensitivity analysis of WAG by means of micromodel, S. Taheri., 2006.
58.	Finite element simulation of counter-current imbibition in a single matrix block, M. Rafieenia, 2006.
59.	Integration of time lapse seismic modeling into history matching of reservoir simulation, M. Paydayesh, 2006.
60.	Numerical simulation of heavy oil recovery by in-situ combustion, M. Sharifi, 2006.
61.	Experimental investigation of effect of depletion of Iranian heavy oil system, M. Fazaelizadeh, 2006.
62.	Determination of dispersion coefficient in VAPEX process through mathematical modeling, S. Goodarzi, 2006.
63.	Flow simulation of naturally fractured reservoirs review of limit, lack and consistency of flow simulators in dual media reservoirs, M. M. Rafiee, 2006.
64.	Simulation of VAPEX style miscible displacement in heavy oil reservoirs, P. Taherian, 2006.
65.	DFN modeling with using Dipmeter Log and Core Data by FRACA and GOFRAK Soft wares, S. Sotoudeh Abdollahi, 2006.
66.	Feasibility study of In-Situ combustion in two Iranian reservoirs, S.V. Mostafavi, 2007.
67.	Improved simulation of thermal recovery process through moving mesh strategy, M. Ahamdi, 2007.
68.	Identification of permeability field using well test data: A case study of Cerereide field in Montpellier France, M. Honarkhah, 2007.
69.	Sensitivity analysis on the VAPEX process in the heavy oil reservoir with overlying Gas Cap, R. Farkhpoor, 2007.
70.	Numerical analysis of improved parameters affecting the forces gravity drainage mechanism in conventional oil reservoir, F. Kamali, 2007.
71.	Experimental study of the hydrocarbon solvent flooding using glass type Micromodel, T. Behrouz, 2007.
72.	Investigation of analytical solution and relative permeability determination in forced gravity drainage process, S. Samani, 2007.
73.	Modeling and simulation of heavy oil recovery through the VAPEX process, A. T. Borujeni, 2007.
74.	Numerical wellbore stability modeling in hydrate bearing sediments, M. M. Saadabad, 2007.
75.	Viability study of implementing smart/intelligent completion in commingled wells in an Australian offshore oil field, M. Nadiripari, 2007.
76.	Modeling and Simulation of In-Situ Combustion in Oil Carbonate Reservoirs, M. Taghavifar, 2007.
77.	Experimental and Numerical Study of Dispersion Coefficients in Miscible Flooding of Hydrocarbon Solvent Crude Oil Using G.ASS Type Micromodel, A. Rezaeipour, 2007.
78.	Experimental Study of Surfactants/Water/Polymer Flooding Using One-Quarter Five-Spot Glass Micromodels, B. Yadali Jamaloei, 2007. 
79.	Laboratory study on Precipitation of Sulphate Scales in Porous Media Using Visual Glass Micromodels, S. M. Ghaderi, 2007.
80.	Cyclic Steam Stimulation by Horizontal Well in One of Iranian Heavy Oil Reservoirs, S. D. Razavi, 2007.
81.	Consideration of PVT Properties in Simulation of Mechanism of VAPEX Method, L. Roohi, 2007.
82.	Experimental and numerical study of solvent flooding to heavy oil reservoirs using 5-spot glass micromodels, Farzaneh S.A., 2008.
83.	Rock type determination based on Lithologic Facies, M. Bagher Shavar, 2008.
84.	Effect of Mixed \gas Solvent Injection on the Performance of the VAPEX Process in a Fracture Oil Sample, M. Derakhshanfar, 2008.
85.	Feasibility study of Toe to Heel Air Injection for Kuh-e-Mond Naturally Fractured Carbonate Reservoir, S. M. Fatemi, 2008. 
86.	Feasibility Study of Drilling Multilateral Wells Among at Improving Gas Recovery in South Pars Gas Field, M. J. Khosravani, 2008.
87.	Experimental and Simulation Study of Polymer Flooding in Five-Spot Glass Micromodel, M. Rafiee, 2008.
88.	Role of Asphaltene Precipitation on Performance of Vapex Process Including Dry and Non-Dry Systems, M. Ardali, 2008.
89.	Experimental Investigation of Asphaltene Precipitation Due to Pressure Depletion in one of the Iranian Oil Reservoir, H. Firoozinia, 2008.
90.	Investigation of CO2 Injection in one of the Iranian Crude Oil, M. Sadeghi Moghadam, 2008. 
91.	Numerical Simulation of Heavy Oil Recovery through Vapex and Hot Solvent Injection, A. Sabzidizajyekan, 2008.
92.	Analysis of Condensate Banking Effects and Behavior in Well During Producing of Gas Condensate Reservoir, K. Qorbani, 2008.
93.	Experimental study of wettability and Pore Geometry Effects on Heavy Oil Recovery of Hydrocarbon Solvent Flooding, A. Dehghan, 2008.
94.	Modeling of Asphaltene precipitation and its effect on permeability reduction, Zargar Z., 2008.
95.	Simulation study of Thermally Assisted Gas Oil Gravity Drainage in one of Iranian Fractured Reservoirs, Y. Mahmoodi  Razmaghan, 2009.
96.	The Role of Wettability in Immiscible Gas Assisted Gravity Drainage (GAGD) Process, A. Alipoor Tabrizi, 2009.
97.	Uncertainty Analysis of Gas Assisted Gravity Drainage (GAGD) Using Experimental Design Theory, M. Sadeghi, 2009.
98.	Thermodynamic Modeling of Asphaltene Precipitation in one of Iranian Oil Reservoir, S. Mahdavi, 2009.
99.	Experimental Study and Modeling of Asphaltene Precipitation of an Iranian Oil Reservoir, S. Haqparast, 2009.
100.	Experimental and Simulation of Formation Damage Due to Asphaltene Deposition In porous MediaA. Mirzabozorg, 2009.
101.	Scaling study of water injection process, N. Mosavati, 2009.
102.	Experimental and simulation study of Asphaltene precipitation in porous media, M. Khalili, 2009.
103.	Thermodynamic modeling study of Asphaltene precipitation in crude oil, M. Tavakkoli, 2009.
104.	Experimental study of the pressure depletion effect on the Asphaltene precipitation in an Iranian oil reservoir, S. Afshari aboualkrloo, 2009.
105.	Experimental investigation of solvent injection into heavy oil layered reservoirs using micromodel, E. Hadi, 2009.
106.	Experimental and modeling investigation of Asphaltene precipitation during CO2 injection in an Iranian crude oil sample, A. Alizadeh, 2009.
107.	Experimental investigation of the effect of gas recycling on the Asphaltene precipitation in an Iranian oil reservoir, H. Nakhli, 2009.
108.	Investigation of re-infiltration phenomena in a dual porosity model, R. Askarinezhad, 2009.
109.	Simulation of asphaltene precipitation deposition due to pressure depletion in an Iranian oil field, Z. Piroozan, 2009.
110.	Modeling study of permeability reduction due to asphaltene deposition in reservoir using experimental data, V. Hemmatfar, 2009.
111.	A comparative simulation study of different gas injection EOR scenarios for one the Iranian fractured oil reservoirs, M. Khazaei, 2010.
112.	Experimental and Modeling simulation study of asphaltene precipitation due to CO2 injection in one of Iranian oil reservoir, T. Pak 2010.
113.	Experimental and simulation studies on applicability of surfactant in foam assisted water alternating gas injection in one of Iranian oil reservoir, A. Gandomkar, 2010.
114.	Experimental and simulation studies on applicability of immiscible water alternating CO2 injection in secondary and tertiary oil recovery in one of Iranian oil reservoir, M. Motealleh, 2010.
115.	PVT modeling of compositional grading in petroleum reservoirs, M.H. Nikpoor, 2010.
116.	Investigation of Average Saturation Profile Versus Time for the Stack of Blocks by Considering Time-Dependent Rate in Naturally Fractured Reservoirs, Bina O., 2010.
117.	Experimental Investigation of the Matrix and Fracture Parameters Affecting Block to Block Interaction and Oil Recovery Efficiency during Gravity Drainage Using Glass Micromodel, V. Mashayekhizdeh, 2010.
118.	Modeling Study of Permeability Reduction due to Asphaltene Deposition in Reservoir Rocks Using Experimental Data, H. Vadidfar, 2010
119.	Experimental Screening Study of EOR Scenarios for One of Iranian Oil Reservoirs Using Glass Micromodel, H. Hematpour, 2010.
120.	Seismic -Geostatistical Reservoir Modeling Using Collocated Cokriging Method (A Case Study in South Pars Gas Field), M. Tavakolo, 2010. 
121.	Investigation of Parameters Affecting Nanoparticle Flooding, A. Heydariyan, 2012.
122.	Analysis of parameters affecting VAPEX process in fractured reservoirs, H. Pendar, 2012.

123.	Optimization of water – flooding projects using harmony search algorithm, M. Khalili 2012.
124.	 Experimental study of pressure temperature and salinity Impact on stability of Nano-particles emulsion and their impact on water flooding performance, J. Esmaeli, 2012.
125.	Investigation of reservoir parameter on GAGD process for naturally fractured reservoir, E. Mesagh, 2013. 
126.	Experimental study of effect of utilizing polymer agents to stabilize nanoparticle solutions for EOR purposes, R. Elhei, 2013.
127.	Asphaltene phase Envelope (APE) development using artificial neural network and fuzzy logic based on experimental data, M. Mohamedi, 2013.
128.	Investigating the Dynamic Phase Behavior of Asphaltene in Wellbore, A. Ayoobi, 2013.
129.	Experimental investigation of Asphaltene inhibitors for an Iranian oil field (South western region, Madhi M, 2013.
130.	The investigation and prediction of Asphaltene deposition at the wellbore, Khoram A., 2014.
131.	Classification of layers and formations in one of Iran's oil field with sonic log and selection of appropriate Bit, S. Parvezi, 2014.
132.	Investigation the effect of molecular diffusion and compositional gradient on miscible displacement of heavy and light in oil Iranian reservoirs, S. Rahbani, 2014.
133.	Investigation of Asphaltene Deposition and Precipitation in Production Tubing, A. Rastghoo, 2014.
134.	Dynamic modeling of asphaltene deposition and assessing formation damage during natural depletion, GH. Fallahnejad, 2014.
135.	Experimental study of Carbonated water flooding (CWF) for carbonated reservoirs, Bakhshi P, 2014.
136.	The predictions of Asphaltene deposition in the well in the gas lift process, Lashkari H, 2015.
137.	Application of the pore scale microscopic imaging and modeling of rocks on reservoir evaluation and risk analysis, Rabani A., 2016.
138.	Upscaling the Surfactant Polymer Flooding and Its Application for an Iranian Reservoir, Reihani L.M., 2017.
139.	Redevelopment Strategies of a Carbonate Reservoir Field with Optimal Oil Production Management Approach, Moradi M., 2017.

Teaching experience
 Basic Engineering Thermodynamics
 Basic Reservoir Engineering
 Material and Energy Balances
 Properties of Petroleum Fluids
 Properties of Petroleum Fluids Lab.
 Applied Mathematics in Petroleum Engineering
 Applied Mathematics in Chemical Engineering
 Design and Economics in Chemical Engineering
 Design and Economics in Petroleum Engineering
 Enhanced Oil Recovery 
 Advanced Design
 Advanced Drilling Fluids
 Advanced Mathematics in Chemical Engineering
 Advanced Mathematics in Petroleum Engineering
 Advanced Modeling & Simulation in Chemical Engineering
 Advanced PVT Analysis
 Advanced Enhanced Oil Recovery
 Reservoir Simulation 
 Advanced modeling & Reservoir Simulation
 Applied Mathematics in Accounting & Management
 Advanced Improved and Enhanced Oil recovery for Reservoir Management
 Reservoir Simulation for Reservoir Management
 Enhanced Oil Recovery of Naturally Fractured Carbonated Reservoir

References

Year of birth missing (living people)
Living people
Iranian chemical engineers
University of Kansas alumni
Academic staff of the University of Leoben